= David W. Allvin =

23rd Chief of Staff of the United States Air Force

David Allvin
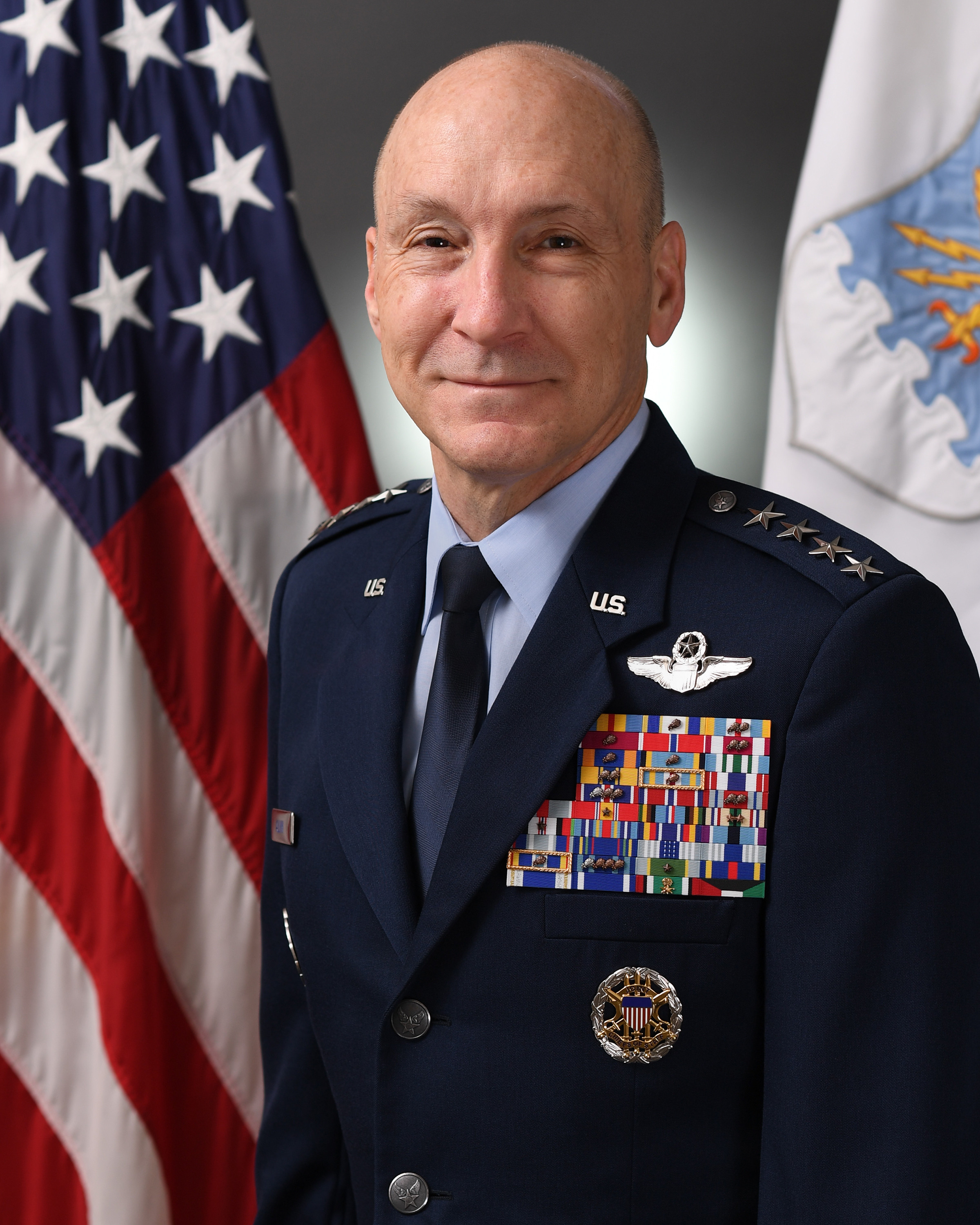
- Official portrait, 2023
- Born: 1963 (age 62–63)
- Education: United States Air Force Academy (BS); Troy University (MS)
- Military career
- Allegiance: United States
- Branch: United States Air Force
- Service years: 1986–2025
- Rank: General
- Commands: Chief of Staff of the Air Force; Vice Chief of Staff of the Air Force; 618th Air and Space Operations Center (Tanker Airlift Control Center); NATO Air Training Command-Afghanistan
- Conflicts: Gulf War; War in Afghanistan
- Awards: Defense Distinguished Service Medal; Air Force Distinguished Service Medal (2); Defense Superior Service Medal (3); Legion of Merit (2); Bronze Star
- David W. Allvin's voice Allvin's opening statement at a House Armed Services Readiness Subcommittee hearing on military readiness. Recorded 19 July 2022

David Wayne Allvin (born c. 1963) is a retired United States Air Force four-star general who last served as the 23rd chief of staff of the Air Force from 2 November 2023 to 3 November 2025. Before that, he served as the 40th vice chief of staff of the Air Force from November 2020 to November 2023, and as acting chief of staff of the Air Force from September to November 2023.

He previously served as the director for strategy, plans, and policy, J-5, on the Joint Staff, and is a senior member, United States Delegation to the United Nations Military Staff Committee, the Pentagon, Arlington, Virginia.

== Personal life ==
Allvin and his wife Gina have two sons and a daughter. Gina has been a prominent figure in the Air Force community, often participating in events focused on family readiness and support for military spouses.

== Military career ==
Allvin graduated from the United States Air Force Academy in 1986. During his time at the Academy he played team handball with USAFA Team Handball. At the U.S. Olympic Festival 1986 he played for the North team. He has commanded at the squadron and wing levels, including the 97th Air Mobility Wing, Altus Air Force Base, Oklahoma. He has held major command staff assignments and served on the Joint Staff.

Allvin served as the commanding general of NATO Air Training Command – Afghanistan; commander of 438th Air Expeditionary Wing, Kabul, Afghanistan; commander of 618th Air and Space Operations Center; director of strategy, concepts and assessments; deputy chief of staff for strategic plans and requirements, Headquarters, U.S. Air Force, and director, strategy, plans and policy, Headquarters United States European Command, Stuttgart-Vaihingen, Germany. He most recently served as vice director of strategy, plans and policy, the Joint Staff.

In August 2020, Allvin was nominated for promotion to general and assignment as the next Vice Chief of Staff of the United States Air Force. The Senate confirmed the nomination in October 2020, and he was promoted to general on 12 November 2020.

On 25 July 2023, Allvin was nominated for appointment as chief of staff of the United States Air Force. He was confirmed on 2 November 2023 and sworn in on the same day. The Senate vote was 95 to 1. The swearing-in took place at Falcon Stadium at the Air Force Academy, where he had been commissioned.

In February 2024, Allvin and other Air Force leaders announced a series of changes to the structure of the service intended to prepare it for a conflict with China. In early 2025, Secretary of Defense Pete Hegseth ordered the Air Force to put this reorganization on hold.

On 18 August 2025, Allvin announced his retirement after two years as chief of staff, about half the usual tenure. He held a retirement ceremony at Joint Base Andrews on 10 October 2025, and the Senate confirmed Kenneth S. Wilsbach as his successor on 30 October 2025.

== George Mason University ==
On May 14, 2026, Allvin delivered the commencement address at George Mason University and was awarded the honorary degree of doctor of humane letters.

On June 25, 2026, Allvin was appointed vice president for leadership and strategy at the university.

== Education ==
- 1986 Bachelor of Science, astronautical engineering, U.S. Air Force Academy, Colorado Springs, Colorado
- 1989 Master of Science, management, Troy State University, Troy, Alabama
- 1992 Distinguished Graduate, Squadron Officer School, Maxwell Air Force Base, Alabama
- 1998 Distinguished Graduate, Air Command and Staff College, Maxwell AFB, Alabama
- 1999 Master of Airpower Art and Science, School of Advanced Airpower Studies, Maxwell AFB, Alabama
- 2000 Air War College, Maxwell AFB, Ala., by correspondence
- 2004 Distinguished Graduate, Master of Science, national security strategy, National War College, Fort Lesley J. McNair, Washington, D.C.
- 2006 Executive Leadership Seminar, Smeal Business College, Pennsylvania State University, College Park
- 2008 Program for Senior Managers in National Security, The George Washington University, Washington, D.C.
- 2008 Air Force Enterprise Leadership Seminar, University of North Carolina, Chapel Hill
- 2009 Program for Senior Executive Fellows, John F. Kennedy School of Government, Harvard University, Cambridge, Massachusetts
- 2010 Fellow, Council on Foreign Relations, New York, N.Y.
- 2013 Combined Force Air Component Commander Course, Maxwell AFB, Alabama
- 2014 Joint Flag Officer Warfighting Course, Maxwell AFB, Alabama
- 2020 Leadership at the Peak, Center for Creative Leadership, Colorado Springs, Colorado

== Assignments ==
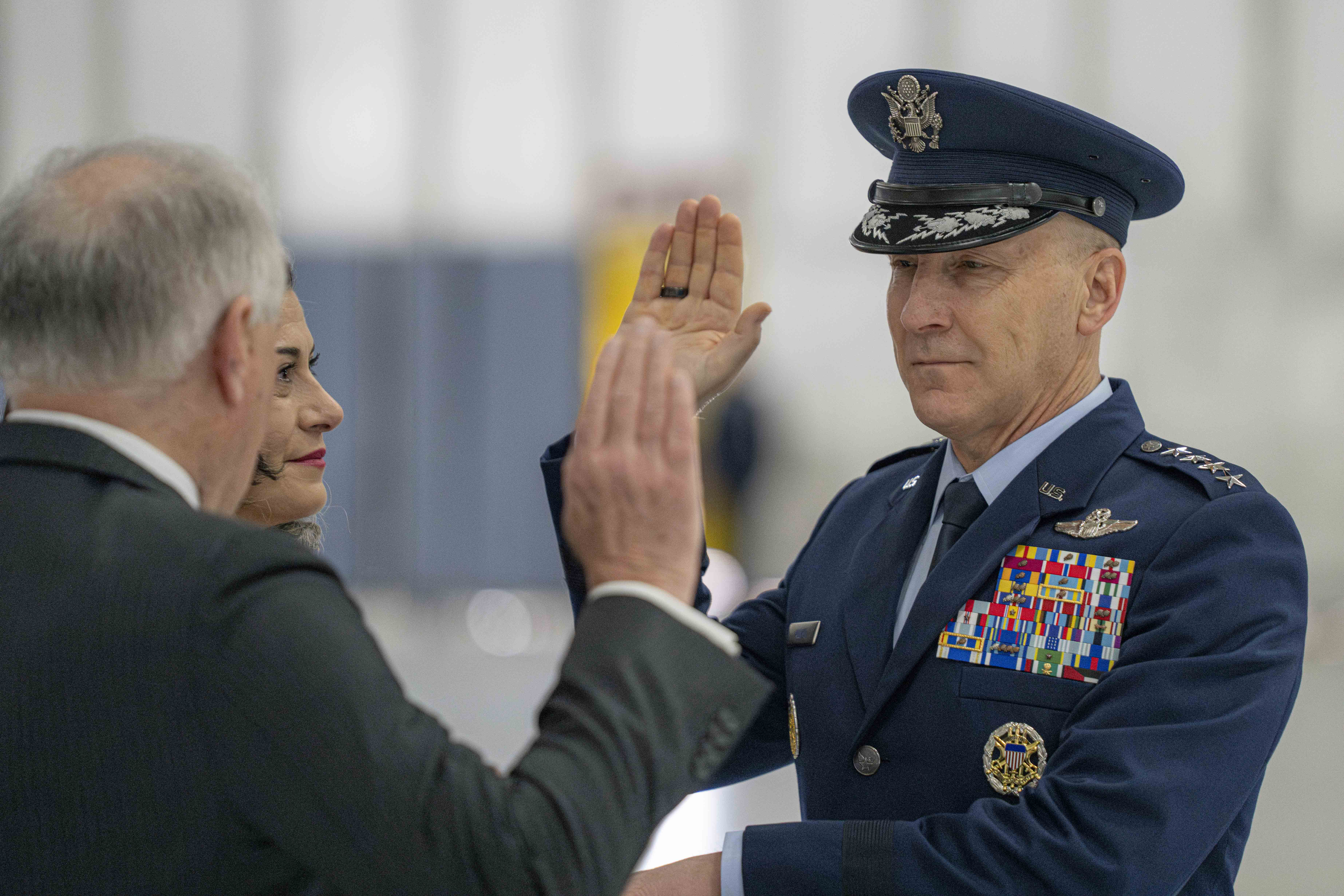
Allvin is ceremonially sworn in as the 23rd chief of staff of the Air Force on 17 November 2023

- June 1986 – August 1987, student, Undergraduate Pilot Training, 82nd Student Squadron, Williams Air Force Base, Arizona
- November 1987 – August 1990, C-12F copilot, aircraft commander, instructor pilot and flight examiner, 58th Military Airlift Squadron, Ramstein Air Base, Germany
- August 1990 – June 1993, C-141B copilot, aircraft commander, instructor pilot and flight examiner, 36th Military Airlift Squadron, McChord AFB, Washington
- June 1993 – June 1994, student, U.S. Air Force Test Pilot School, Edwards AFB, California
- June 1994 – July 1997, C-17 Globemaster III and C-130J Super Hercules Experimental Test Pilot, Flight Commander, Flight Examiner and Assistant Operations Officer, 418th Flight Test Squadron, Edwards AFB, California
- August 1997 – June 1998, student, Air Command and Staff College, Maxwell AFB, Alabama
- July 1998 – June 1999, student, School of Advanced Airpower Studies, Maxwell AFB, Alabama
- June 1999 – April 2001, assistant chief of Commander's Action Group, Headquarters Air Mobility Command, Scott AFB, Illinois
- April 2001 – June 2003, commander, 905th Air Refueling Squadron, Grand Forks AFB, North Dakota
- June 2003 – June 2004, student, National War College, Fort Lesley J. McNair, Washington, D.C.
- June 2004 – June 2005, chief of Organizational Policy Branch, Policy Division, Joint Staff, the Pentagon, Arlington, Virginia
- June 2005 – April 2006, special assistant to the director, Joint Staff, the Pentagon, Arlington, Virginia
- May 2006 – July 2007, vice commander of 12th Flying Training Wing, Randolph AFB, Texas
- August 2007 – July 2009, commander of 97th Air Mobility Wing, Altus AFB, Oklahoma
- August 2009 – August 2010, Senior Air Force Fellow, Council on Foreign Relations, New York, N.Y.
- September 2010 – August 2011, commanding general, NATO Air Training Command – Afghanistan, NATO Training Mission-Afghanistan/Combined Security Transition Command-Afghanistan, and commander of 438th Air Expeditionary Wing, Kabul, Afghanistan
- September 2011 – April 2012, vice commander, 618th Tanker Airlift Control Center, Scott AFB, Illinois
- April 2012 – June 2013, commander of 618th Air and Space Operations Center (Tanker Airlift Control Center), Scott AFB, Illinois
- June 2013 – September 2014, director for Air Force strategic planning, Deputy Chief of Staff for Strategic Plans and Programs, Headquarters U.S. Air Force, the Pentagon, Arlington, Virginia
- October 2014 – August 2015, director for strategy, concepts, and assessments, Deputy Chief of Staff for Strategic Plans and Requirements, Headquarters U.S. Air Force, the Pentagon, Arlington, Virginia
- August 2015 – July 2018, director for strategy and policy, Headquarters U.S. European Command, Stuttgart-Vaihingen, Germany
- August 2018 – January 2019, vice director of strategy, plans, and policy (J-5), Joint Staff, the Pentagon, Arlington, Virginia
- January 2019 – November 2020, director for strategy, plans, and policy, J-5, Joint Staff; and senior member, United States Delegation to the United Nations Military Staff Committee, the Pentagon, Arlington, Virginia
- November 2020 – November 2023, Vice Chief of Staff of the U.S. Air Force, Washington, D.C.
- November 2023 – November 2025, Chief of Staff of the U.S. Air Force, Washington, D.C.

== Flight information ==
Rating: Command pilot
Flight hours: More than 4,600 (including 800 flight test hours)
Aircraft flown: C-12F, C-141A/B, KC-135R/T, C-17, C-130, C-130J, C-23, F-15, F-16, T-38.

== Awards and decorations ==
US Air Force Command Pilot Badge
Office of the Joint Chiefs of Staff Identification Badge
Headquarters Air Force Badge

Defense Distinguished Service Medal
Air Force Distinguished Service Medal with two bronze oak leaf cluster
Defense Superior Service Medal with two bronze oak leaf clusters
Legion of Merit with oak leaf cluster
Bronze Star Medal
Meritorious Service Medal with two oak leaf clusters
Air Medal with oak leaf cluster
Aerial Achievement Medal with oak leaf cluster
Joint Service Commendation Medal
Air Force Commendation Medal with two oak leaf clusters
Joint Meritorious Unit Award with oak leaf cluster
Air Force Meritorious Unit Award
Air Force Outstanding Unit Award with one silver and two bronze oak leaf clusters
Air Force Organizational Excellence Award
Combat Readiness Medal with two oak leaf clusters
Air Force Recognition Ribbon
National Defense Service Medal with one bronze service star
Armed Forces Expeditionary Medal
Southwest Asia Service Medal with two service stars
Afghanistan Campaign Medal with service star
Global War on Terrorism Expeditionary Medal
Global War on Terrorism Service Medal
Humanitarian Service Medal
Air and Space Campaign Medal
Nuclear Deterrence Operations Service Medal
Air Force Overseas Short Tour Service Ribbon
Air Force Overseas Long Tour Service Ribbon
Air Force Expeditionary Service Ribbon with gold frame and oak leaf cluster
Air Force Longevity Service Award with one silver and three bronze oak leaf clusters
Small Arms Expert Marksmanship Ribbon with service star
Air Force Training Ribbon
NATO Meritorious Service Medal
NATO Medal for service in ex-Yugoslavia
Kuwait Liberation Medal (Saudi Arabia)
Kuwait Liberation Medal (Kuwait)
Grand Cordon of the Order of the Rising Sun (Japan)

== Publications ==
"Paradigm Lost: Rethinking Theater Airlift to Support the Army After Next", Cadre Papers, 9 September 2000

== Dates of promotion ==
Insignia	Rank	Date
	General	12 Nov. 2020
	Lieutenant general	31 Jan. 2019
	Major general	26 July 2013
	Brigadier general	2 Sept. 2010
	Colonel	1 July 2005
	Lieutenant colonel	1 May 2000
	Major	1 Aug. 1996
	Captain	28 May 1990
	First lieutenant	28 May 1988
	Second lieutenant	28 May 1986

Military offices
Preceded by Carlton D. Everhart II	Commander of the 618th Air and Space Operations Center (Tanker Airlift Control Center); 2012–2013	Succeeded by Timothy M. Zadalis
Preceded by Randy A. Kee	Director for Strategy and Policy of the United States European Command; 2015–2018	Succeeded by David Julazadeh
Preceded by Glen D. VanHerck	Vice Director for Strategy, Plans, and Policy of the Joint Staff; 2018–2019	Succeeded by Daryl Caudle
Preceded by Richard D. Clarke	Director for Strategy, Plans, and Policy of the Joint Staff; 2019–2020	Succeeded by Lisa Franchetti
Preceded by Stephen W. Wilson	Vice Chief of Staff of the United States Air Force; 2020–2023	Succeeded by James C. Slife
Preceded by Charles Q. Brown Jr.	Chief of Staff of the United States Air Force; 2023–2025	Succeeded by Kenneth S. Wilsbach
