= Thomas Sharpy =

U.S. Air Force general

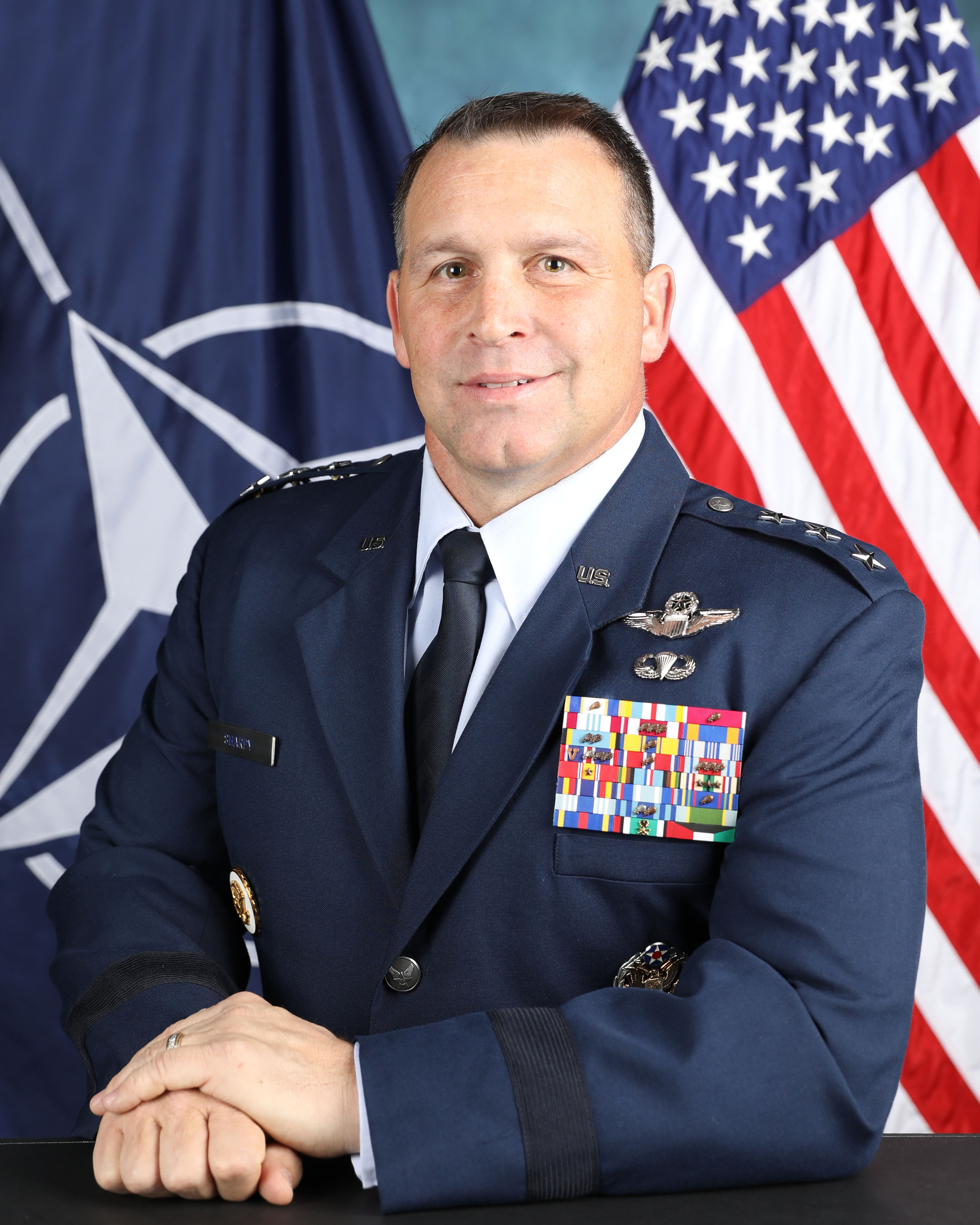
- Military career
- Allegiance: United States
- Branch: United States Air Force
- Service years: 1987–2021
- Rank: Lieutenant General
- Commands: Eighteenth Air Force; 92nd Air Refueling Wing; 9th Airlift Squadron
- Conflicts: Gulf War
- Awards: Air Force Distinguished Service Medal (2); Defense Superior Service Medal; Legion of Merit (2)

Thomas James Sharpy is a retired United States Air Force lieutenant general who last served as the deputy chief of staff for capability development of the Allied Command Transformation. Previously, he was the deputy commander of the Air Mobility Command.

He retired on November 1, 2021.

== Effective dates of promotions ==
| Rank | Date |
|---|---|
| Second Lieutenant | May 27, 1987 |
| First Lieutenant | May 27, 1989 |
| Captain | May 27, 1991 |
| Major | August 1, 1998 |
| Lieutenant Colonel | March 1, 2002 |
| Colonel | March 1, 2006 |
| Brigadier General | October 3, 2011 |
| Major General | June 5, 2015 |
| Lieutenant General | October 12, 2018 |

Military offices
| Preceded by Carlton D. Everhart II | Commander of the Eighteenth Air Force; 2015 | Succeeded by Samuel D. Cox |
| Preceded by Michael S. Stough | Director of Strategic Plans, Requirements, and Programs of the Air Mobility Command; 2015; 2015–2016 | Succeeded by Jon T. Thomas |
| Preceded by Rowayne A. Schatz Jr. | Deputy Commander of the Air Mobility Command; 2016–2018 | Succeeded by Jon T. Thomas |
| Preceded by Jeffrey Lofgren | Deputy Chief of Staff for Capability Development of the Allied Command Transformation; 2018–2021 | Succeeded by David J. Julazadeh |
