= Jon T. Thomas =

United States Air Force general

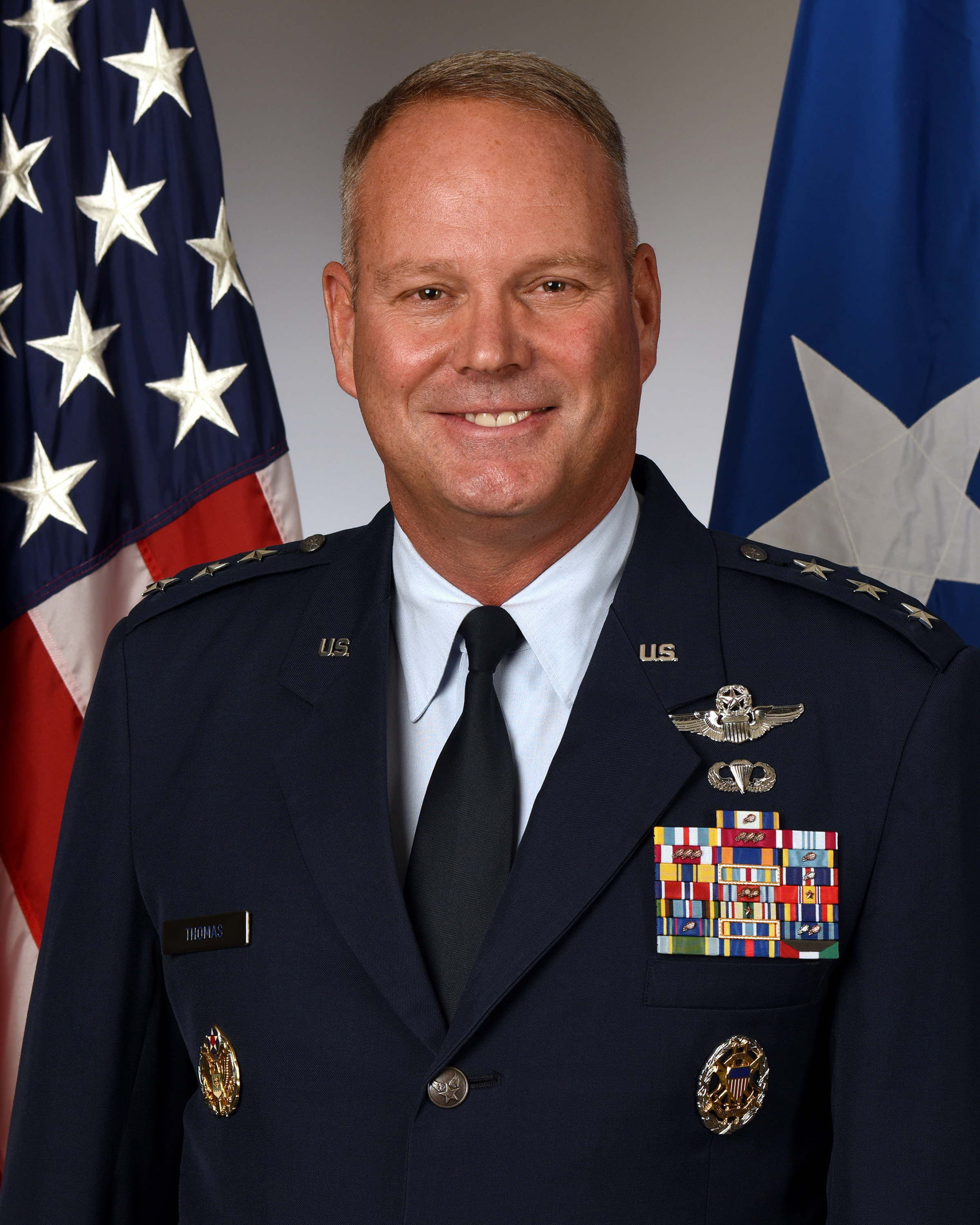
- Born: 1967 (age 58–59)
- Military career
- Allegiance: United States
- Branch: United States Air Force
- Service years: 1989–2021
- Rank: Lieutenant General
- Nickname: Ty
- Commands: 86th Airlift Wing; 97th Air Mobility Wing; 86th Operations Group
- Conflicts: Gulf War
- Awards: Air Force Distinguished Service Medal (2); Defense Superior Service Medal; Legion of Merit (4)

Jon Tyson Thomas (born 1967) is a retired lieutenant general in the United States Air Force, who last served as deputy commander of Pacific Air Forces from 2020 to 2021. From Huntington Beach, California, Thomas was commissioned after graduating from the United States Air Force Academy in 1989.

After his retirement, he became head of the “Air & Space Group” of the private military company Metrea.

== Awards and decorations ==
US Air Force Command Pilot Badge
Basic Parachutist Badge
Office of the Joint Chiefs of Staff Identification Badge
Headquarters Air Force Badge

Air Force Distinguished Service Medal with one bronze oak leaf cluster
Defense Superior Service Medal
Legion of Merit with three oak leaf clusters
Defense Meritorious Service Medal
Meritorious Service Medal with three oak leaf clusters
Air Medal
Aerial Achievement Medal with oak leaf cluster
Air Force Commendation Medal
Joint Meritorious Unit Award
Air Force Outstanding Unit Award with silver oak leaf cluster
Air Force Organizational Excellence Award
Combat Readiness Medal with two oak leaf clusters
National Defense Service Medal with one bronze service star
Armed Forces Expeditionary Medal
Southwest Asia Service Medal with service star
Global War on Terrorism Service Medal
Nuclear Deterrence Operations Service Medal with oak leaf cluster
Air Force Expeditionary Service Ribbon with gold frame
Air Force Longevity Service Award with one silver and one bronze oak leaf clusters
Small Arms Expert Marksmanship Ribbon
Air Force Training Ribbon
Kuwait Liberation Medal (Kuwait)

== Effective dates of promotions ==
Rank	Date
Second Lieutenant	May 31, 1989
First Lieutenant	May 31, 1991
Captain	May 31, 1993
Major	July 1, 1999
Lieutenant Colonel	March 1, 2002
Colonel	January 1, 2007
Brigadier General	August 2, 2013
Major General	June 1, 2017
Lieutenant General	September 4, 2018

Military offices
Preceded by Patrick X. Mordente	Commander of the 86th Airlift Wing; 2015–2016	Succeeded by Richard G. Moore
Preceded by Thomas Sharpy	Director of Strategic Plans, Requirements and Programs of the Air Mobility Command; 2016–2017	Succeeded by John M. Wood
Preceded by Timothy G. Fay	Director of Operations, Strategic Deterrence and Nuclear Integration of the United States Air Forces in Europe – Air Forces Africa; 2017–2018	Succeeded by Charles Corcoran
Preceded by Thomas Sharpy	Deputy Commander of the Air Mobility Command; 2018–2020	Succeeded by Jacqueline Van Ovost
Preceded by Brian Killough	Deputy Commander of the Pacific Air Forces; 2020–2021	Succeeded by James A. Jacobson
