= David Julazadeh =

U.S. Air Force general

David J. Julazadeh
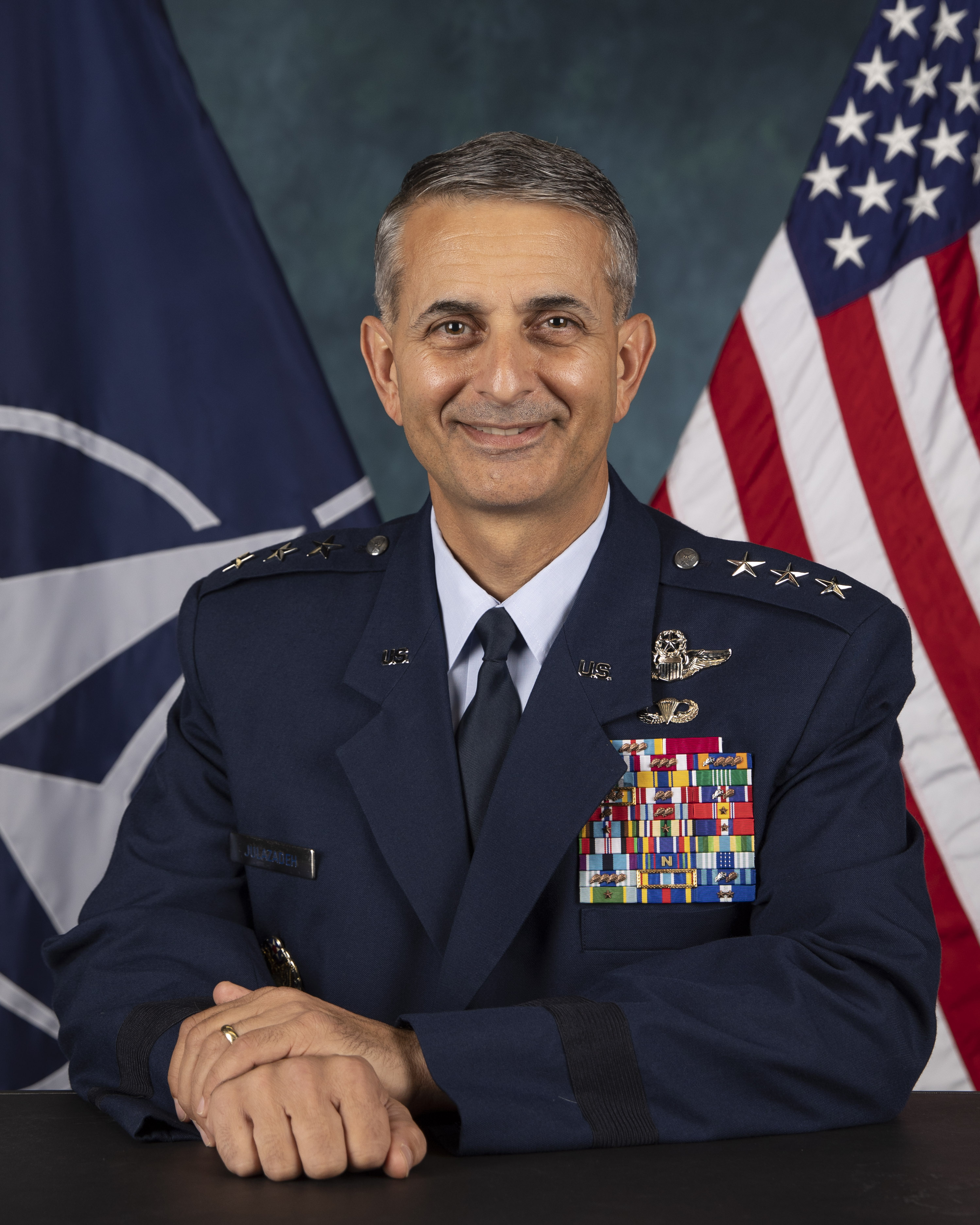
- Military career
- Allegiance: United States
- Branch: United States Air Force
- Service years: 1989–2024
- Rank: Lieutenant General
- Nickname: Dave
- Commands: 455th Air Expeditionary Wing; 52nd Fighter Wing; 56th Operations Support Squadron
- Conflicts: War in Afghanistan
- Awards: Defense Superior Service Medal (4); Legion of Merit; Distinguished Flying Cross

David J. Julazadeh is a retired United States Air Force lieutenant general who served as the deputy chief of staff for capability development of Allied Command Transformation, succeeding Thomas Sharpy. He served as the chief of staff of the United States European Command. Previously, he was the director for plans, policy, strategy, and capabilities of the Pacific Air Forces.

Julazadeh is from East Peoria, Illinois and graduated from Illinois Valley Central High School in 1984. He attended the University of Kansas, graduating in 1989 with a Bachelor of Science degree in civil engineering. Julazadeh later earned a Master of Aeronautical Science degree from Embry–Riddle Aeronautical University in 1994 and a Master of Military Operational Art and Science degree from the Air Command and Staff College in 2003.

Military offices
Preceded by Christopher P. Weggeman	Commander of the 52nd Fighter Wing; 2012–2014	Succeeded by Peter M. Bilodeau
Preceded by Mark D. Kelly	Commander of the 455th Air Expeditionary Wing; 2015–2016	Succeeded by James R. Sears
Preceded by ???	Deputy Director of Operations of the United States Central Command; 2016–2018	Succeeded by Derek France
Preceded by David W. Allvin	Director for Plans, Policy, Strategy, and Capabilities of the United States European Command; 2018–2020	Succeeded by Charles R. Miller
Preceded by Patrick Piercey	Chief of Staff of the United States European Command; 2020–2021	Succeeded by John D. Lamontagne
Preceded by Thomas J. Sharpy	Deputy Chief of Staff for Capability Development of the Allied Command Transformation; 2021–2024	Succeeded by Jeffrey W. Hughes
