= Susan Y. Desjardins =

US Air Force general

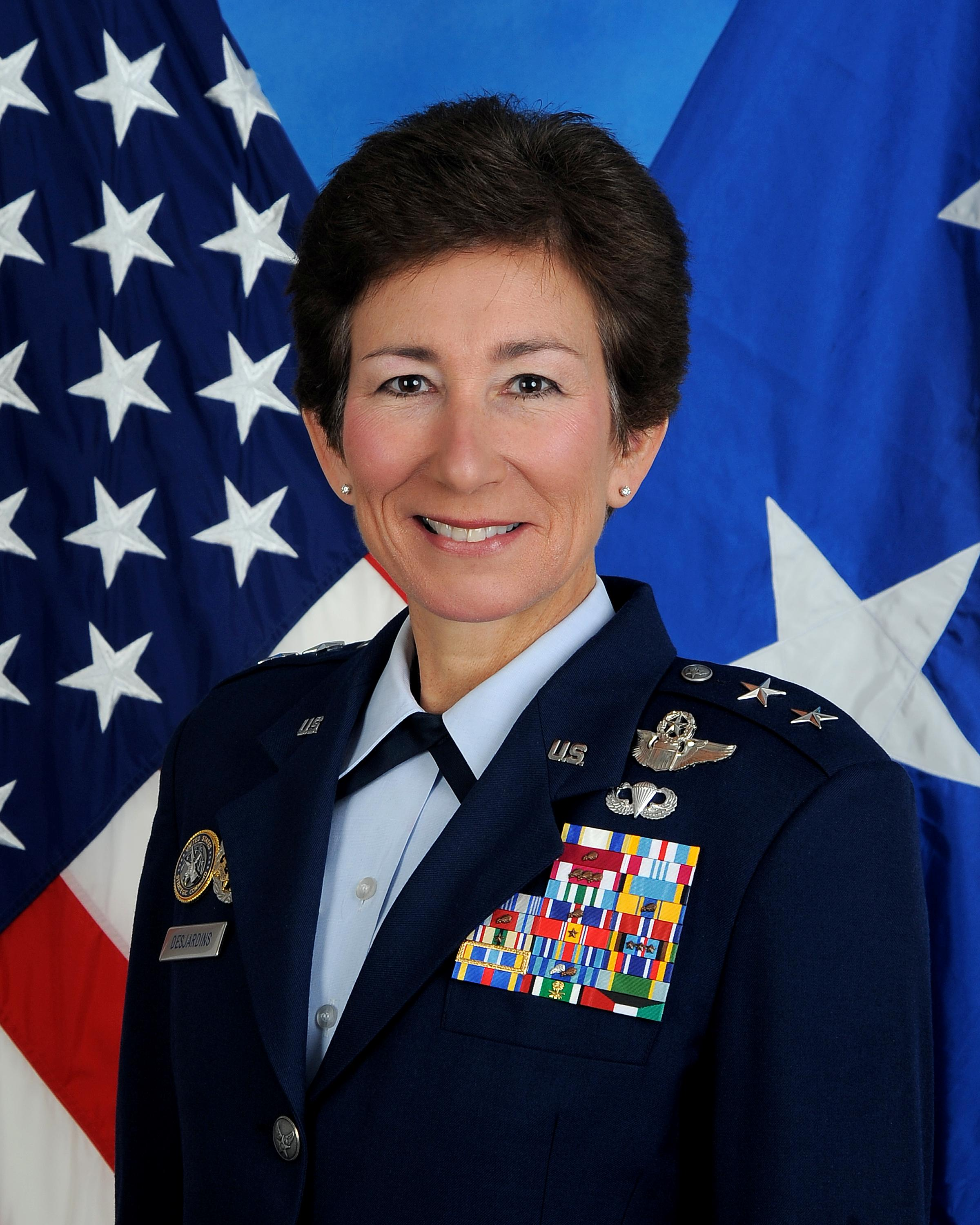
- U.S. Air Force Photo
- Military career
- Allegiance: United States of America
- Branch: United States Air Force
- Service years: 1980–2012
- Rank: Major General
- Conflicts: Gulf War; Global War on Terror
- Awards: Air Force Distinguished Service Medal; Defense Superior Service Medal; Legion of Merit (2); Defense Meritorious Service Medal; Meritorious Service Medal (4); Aerial Achievement Medal; Joint Service Commendation Medal; Air Force Commendation Medal (2); Air Force Achievement Medal; Combat Readiness Medal (2); National Defense Service Medal (2); Armed Forces Expeditionary Medal (3); Southwest Asia Service Medal (2); Global War on Terrorism Expeditionary Medal; Kuwait Liberation Medal (Saudi Arabia); Kuwait Liberation Medal (Kuwait)

Major General Susan Yvonne Desjardins is a retired major general in the United States Air Force. She last served as director of plans and policy (J5), Headquarters U.S. Strategic Command, Offutt Air Force Base, Neb.

== Military career ==
Raised in Portsmouth, New Hampshire, Desjardins graduated from the United States Air Force Academy in 1980. She holds a master's degree in industrial psychology from Louisiana Tech University, and a master's degree in national security and strategic studies from the Naval Command and Staff College. She graduated from the Air War College at Maxwell Air Force Base, Alabama, in 1997 and from the General Manager Program at the Harvard Business School, Harvard University in 2004.

Desjardins has held a variety of staff positions at the major command, Joint Staff and Headquarters U.S. Air Force levels, including deputy military assistant to the Secretary of the Air Force. Her previous command positions have included the 23rd Commandant of the Air Force Academy and 1st female commandant, Colorado Springs, Colorado, 912th Air Refueling Squadron, Grand Forks Air Force Base, North Dakota; the 60th Operations Group, Travis Air Force Base, California, and the 437th Airlift Wing at Charleston Air Force Base, South Carolina. Desjardins is a command pilot with more than 3,800 flying hours in the KC-10, C-17, C-5 Galaxy, KC-135R, KC-135A and T-37.

== Education ==
1980 Bachelor of Science degree in international affairs/political science, U.S. Air Force Academy, Colorado Springs, Colorado
1983 Squadron Officer School, by correspondence
1991 Master of Arts degree in industrial psychology and human relations, Louisiana Tech University
1993 Master of Arts degree in national security and strategic studies, Naval Command and Staff College, Naval War College, Newport, R.I.
1997 Air War College, Maxwell AFB, Ala.
2004 General Manager Program, Harvard Business School, Harvard University, Cambridge, Mass.
2009 National Security Studies Program, George Washington University, Washington, D.C.
2009 Air Force Enterprise Leadership Seminar, University of North Carolina at Chapel Hill

== Assignments ==
1. July 1980 - August 1981, student, undergraduate pilot training, Laughlin AFB, Texas
2. August 1981 - December 1981, KC-135A pilot training, Castle AFB, Calif.
3. December 1981 - October 1985, KC-135A copilot, standardization and evaluation copilot, and aircraft commander, 911th Air Refueling Squadron, Seymour Johnson AFB, N.C.
4. October 1985 - September 1988, KC-10 copilot and aircraft commander, 344th Air Refueling Squadron, Seymour Johnson AFB, N.C.
5. September 1988 - July 1991, KC-10 instructor and evaluator pilot, 2nd Air Refueling Squadron; later, executive officer, 2nd Bombardment Wing, Barksdale AFB, La.
6. July 1991 - August 1992, KC-10 program element monitor, Directorate for Requirements and Test, Headquarters Strategic Air Command, Offutt AFB, Neb.
7. August 1992 - July 1993, student, Naval Command and Staff College, Newport R.I.
8. July 1993 - March 1994, tanker requirements staff officer, Deputy Chief of Staff for Plans and Operations, Headquarters U.S. Air Force, Washington, D.C.
9. March 1994 - March 1995, member, Air Force Issues Team, Deputy Chief of Staff for Plans and Operations, Headquarters U.S. Air Force, Washington, D.C.
10. March 1995 - July 1996, deputy military assistant to the Secretary of the Air Force, Headquarters U.S. Air Force, Washington, D.C.
11. July 1996 - July 1997, student, Air War College, Maxwell AFB, Ala.
12. July 1997 - August 1999, Commander, 912th Air Refueling Squadron, Grand Forks AFB, N.D.
13. August 1999 - March 2002, strategic planner, later, Chief, Nuclear Treaties Branch, Directorate for Strategic Plans and Policy (J5), Joint Staff, the Pentagon, Washington, D.C.
14. March 2002 - August 2003, Commander, 60th Operations Group, Travis AFB, Calif.
15. August 2003 - October 2004, executive officer to the Commander, U.S. Transportation Command, and the Commander, Air Mobility Command, Scott AFB, Ill.
16. October 2004 - November 2005, Commander, 437th Airlift Wing, Charleston AFB, S.C.
17. December 2005 - October 2008, Commandant of Cadets, U.S. Air Force Academy, Colorado Springs, Colo.
18. October 2008 - January 2011, Deputy Director then Director of Strategic Plans, Requirements and Programs, Headquarters Air Mobility Command, Scott AFB, Ill.
19. January 2011 – October 2012, director of plans and policy (J5), U.S. Strategic Command, Offutt AFB, Neb.

== Flight information ==
Rating: Command pilot
Flight hours: More than 3,800
Aircraft flown: KC-10, C-17, C-5, KC-135R, KC-135A and T-37

== Awards and decorations ==
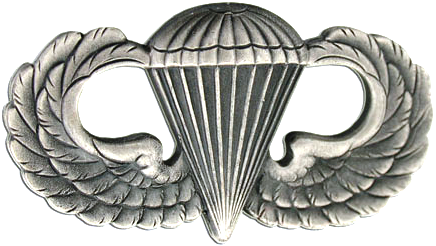
US Air Force Command Pilot Badge
Parachutist Badge
Joint Chiefs of Staff Badge

Air Force Distinguished Service Medal
Defense Superior Service Medal
Legion of Merit with bronze oak leaf cluster
Defense Meritorious Service Medal
Meritorious Service Medal with three bronze oak leaf clusters
Aerial Achievement Medal
Joint Service Commendation Medal
Air Force Commendation Medal with bronze oak leaf cluster
Air Force Achievement Medal
Air Force Outstanding Unit Award with bronze oak leaf cluster
Air Force Organizational Excellence Award
Combat Readiness Medal with bronze oak leaf cluster
National Defense Service Medal with bronze service star
Armed Forces Expeditionary Medal with three bronze service stars
Southwest Asia Service Medal with bronze service star
Global War on Terrorism Expeditionary Medal
Global War on Terrorism Service Medal
Air Force Expeditionary Service Ribbon with gold frame
Air Force Longevity Service Award with silver and bronze oak leaf cluster
Small Arms Expert Marksmanship Ribbon
Air Force Training Ribbon
Kuwait Liberation Medal (Saudi Arabia)
Kuwait Liberation Medal (Kuwait)

== Effective dates of promotion ==
Promotions
Insignia	Rank	Date
	Major General	September 10, 2009
	Brigadier General	September 2, 2006
	Colonel	April 1, 2000
	Lieutenant Colonel	December 1, 1996
	Major	June 1, 1992
	Captain	May 28, 1984
	First Lieutenant	May 28, 1982
	Second Lieutenant	May 28, 1980

Military offices
Preceded by Johnny A. Weida	Commandant of Cadets of the United States Air Force Academy; 2005–2008	Succeeded by Samuel D. Cox
Preceded by Susan J. Helms	Director of Plans and Policy of the United States Strategic Command; 2011–2012	Succeeded by John W. Raymond
