= Robert R. Allardice =

US Air Force officer (born c. 1958)

Lieutenant General Robert R. Allardice
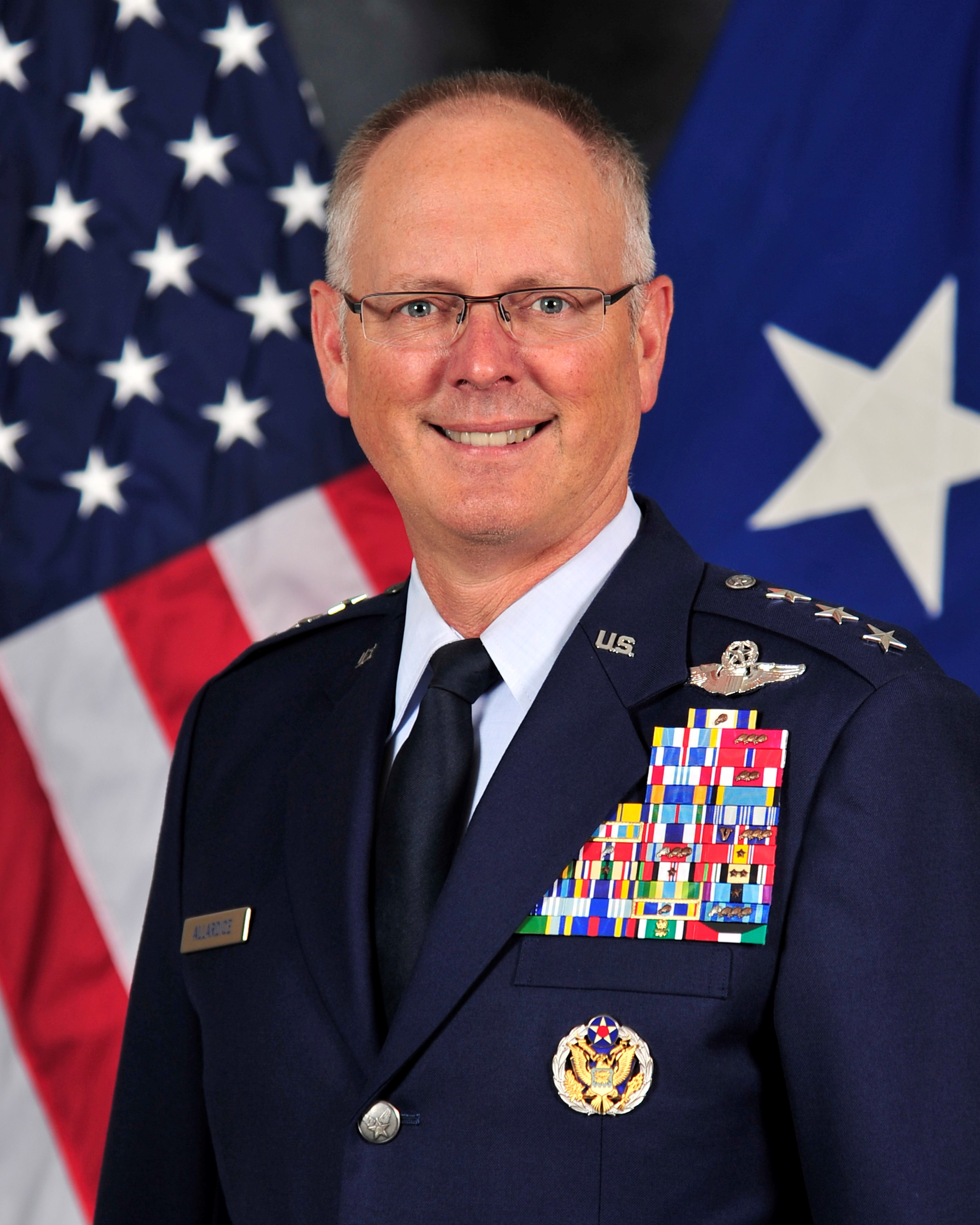
- Lieutenant General Robert R. Allardice, USAF, c. 2009
- Born: c. 1958 (age 67–68)
- Education: U.S. Air Force Academy (BS); University of Southern California (MS)
- Military career
- Allegiance: United States
- Branch: United States Air Force
- Service years: 1980–2013
- Rank: Lieutenant General
- Commands: 18th Air Force; 62nd Airlift Wing; 437th Operations Group; 9th Airlift Squadron
- Awards: Air Force Distinguished Service Medal (2); Defense Superior Service Medal; Legion of Merit (4); Distinguished Flying Cross; Bronze Star Medal; Defense Meritorious Service Medal; Meritorious Service Medal (3); Air Medal

Lieutenant General Robert Ray Allardice (born c. 1958) is a retired United States Air Force officer who last served as the vice commander of Air Mobility Command from September 2011 to September 2013. Prior to that, he served as the commanding general of 18th Air Force from August 2009 to September 2011.

Raised in Camino, California, Allardice entered the Air Force in 1980 as a graduate of the U.S. Air Force Academy, earning a Bachelor of Science degree in civil engineering. He has commanded at the squadron, group, wing, and numbered air force level.

Allardice is a command pilot with more than 5,000 hours in the C-141, C-5, C-17, KC-135 and C-21.

== Education ==
- 1980 Bachelor of Science degree in civil engineering, U.S. Air Force Academy, Colorado Springs, Colorado
- 1985 Squadron Officer School, Maxwell AFB, Alabama
- 1987 Master's degree in systems management, University of Southern California, Los Angeles, California
- 1993 Air Command and Staff College, Maxwell AFB, Alabama
- 1998 Air War College, Maxwell AFB, Alabama
- 2003 Senior Executive Fellowship, John F. Kennedy School of Government, Harvard University, Cambridge, Massachusetts
- 2006 Program for Senior Managers in Government, John F. Kennedy School of Government, Harvard University, Cambridge, Massachusetts

== Military assignments ==
- September 1980 – August 1981, student, undergraduate pilot training, Williams AFB, Arizona
- September 1981 – September 1986, instructor pilot and flight examiner, 86th Military Airlift Squadron, Travis AFB, California
- October 1986 – September 1987, Air Staff Training officer, Deputy Chief of Staff for Plans and Operations, Headquarters U.S. Air Force, Washington, D.C.
- October 1987 – August 1990, instructor pilot and flight examiner, 57th Military Airlift Squadron, Altus AFB, Oklahoma
- September 1990 – July 1992, joint training and operations officer, director of operations, Headquarters U.S. European Command, Stuttgart-Vaihingen, Germany
- August 1992 – June 1993, student, Air Command and Staff College, Maxwell AFB, Alabama
- July 1993 – September 1993, student, Armed Forces Staff College, Norfolk, Virginia
- October 1993 – June 1997, chief of safety, 436th Airlift Wing, and commander of 9th Airlift Squadron, Dover AFB, Delaware
- July 1997 – May 1998, student, Air War College, Maxwell AFB, Alabama
- June 1998 – October 1998, chief of War and Mobilization Plans Division, Directorate of Operations and Training, Deputy Chief of Staff for Air and Space Operations, Headquarters U.S. Air Force, Washington, D.C.
- October 1998 – May 2000, chief of Expeditionary Air Force Implementation Division, Directorate of EAF Implementation, Deputy Chief of Staff for Air and Space Operations, Headquarters U.S. Air Force, Washington, D.C.
- May 2000 – June 2002, commander of 437th Operations Group, Charleston AFB, South Carolina
- June 2002 – June 2004, commander of 62nd Airlift Wing, McChord AFB, Washington
- June 2004 – October 2005, director of personnel, Headquarters Air Force Materiel Command, Wright-Patterson AFB, Ohio
- October 2005 – March 2007, director of airman development and sustainment, Deputy Chief of Staff for Manpower and Personnel, Headquarters U.S. Air Force, Washington, D.C.
- March 2007 – March 2008, commander of Coalition Air Force Transition Team, Baghdad, Iraq
- April 2008 – July 2009, director for strategy, plans and policy, Headquarters U.S. Central Command, MacDill AFB, Florida
- August 2009 – September 2011, commander of 18th Air Force, Scott AFB, Illinois
- September 2011 – present, vice commander of Air Mobility Command, Scott AFB, Illinois

== Effective dates of promotion ==
Insignia	Rank	Date
	Lieutenant general	August 19, 2009
	Major general	February 25, 2008
	Brigadier general	October 1, 2005
	Colonel	September 1, 1998
	Lieutenant colonel	March 1, 1994
	Major	October 1, 1991
	Captain	May 28, 1984
	First lieutenant	May 28, 1982
	Second lieutenant	May 28, 1980

== Post-military career ==
Allardice is employed as a senior mentor for the Joint Staff, J7, in support of Combatant Command and Joint Task Force Operations and Exercises. He also serves as a Senior Fellow in support of the National Defense University’s Pinnacle, Capstone, and Keystone programs, which are designed to train newly selected generals and admirals to be more effective in joint and multinational operations.

Allardice is also a member of the Air Force Studies Board of the National Academies’ National Research Council, “Opportunities for the Employment of Simulation in U.S. Air Force Training Environments.”

Allardice founded Allardice™ Enterprises, Inc., in 2013 after serving in the United States Air Force for over 33 years.
