= Samuel D. Cox =

United States Air Force general

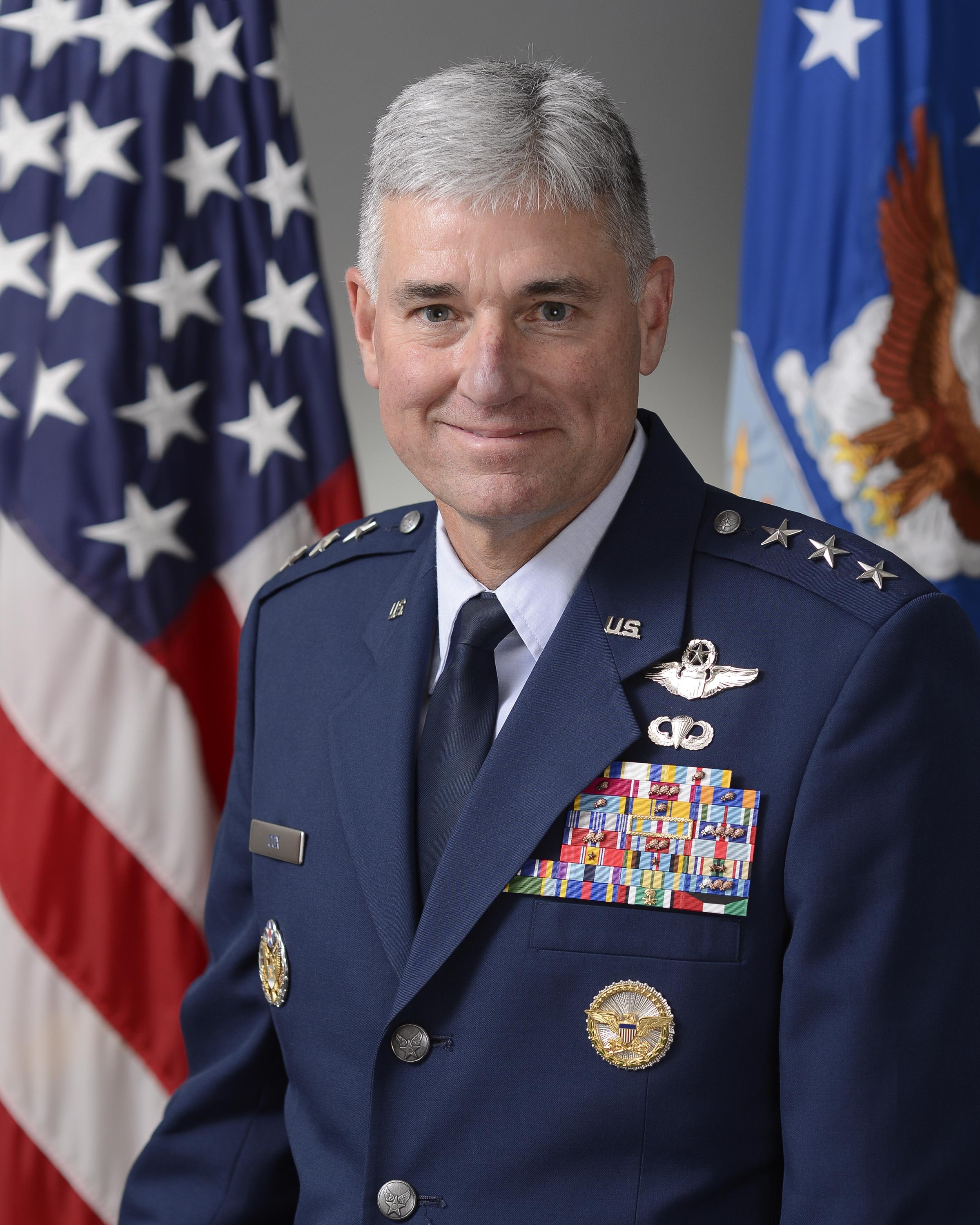
- Born: December 26, 1961 (age 64)
- Military career
- Allegiance: United States
- Branch: United States Air Force
- Service years: 1984–2017
- Rank: Lieutenant general
- Commands: Eighteenth Air Force; 618th Air and Space Operations Center; 436th Airlift Wing; 14th Airlift Squadron
- Conflicts: Gulf War
- Awards: Air Force Distinguished Service Medal; Defense Superior Service Medal (2); Legion of Merit (2)

Samuel D. Cox (born December 26, 1961) is a retired United States Air Force lieutenant general who commanded the Eighteenth Air Force from 2015 to 2017.

Military offices
Preceded by Mark S. Solo	Commander of the 618th Air and Space Operations Center; 2010–2011	Succeeded by Carlton D. Everhart II
Preceded by ???	Director of Strategy, Policy, Programs, and Logistics of the United States Transportation Command; 2011–2012	Succeeded by William A. Brown
Preceded by Michael J. Lally	Director of Operations and Plans of the United States Transportation Command; 2012–2013	Succeeded by Rowayne A. Schatz Jr.
Preceded by Susan Y. Desjardins	Commandant of Cadets of the United States Air Force Academy; 2008–2010	Succeeded by Richard M. Clark
Preceded by Darrell D. Jones	Deputy Chief of Staff for Manpower, Personnel and Services of the United States Air Force; 2013–2015	Succeeded by Gina Grosso
Preceded by Thomas Sharpy	Commander of the Eighteenth Air Force; 2015–2017	Succeeded by Giovanni K. Tuck
