= Eighteenth Air Force =

Numbered air force of the United States Air Force responsible for air mobility forces

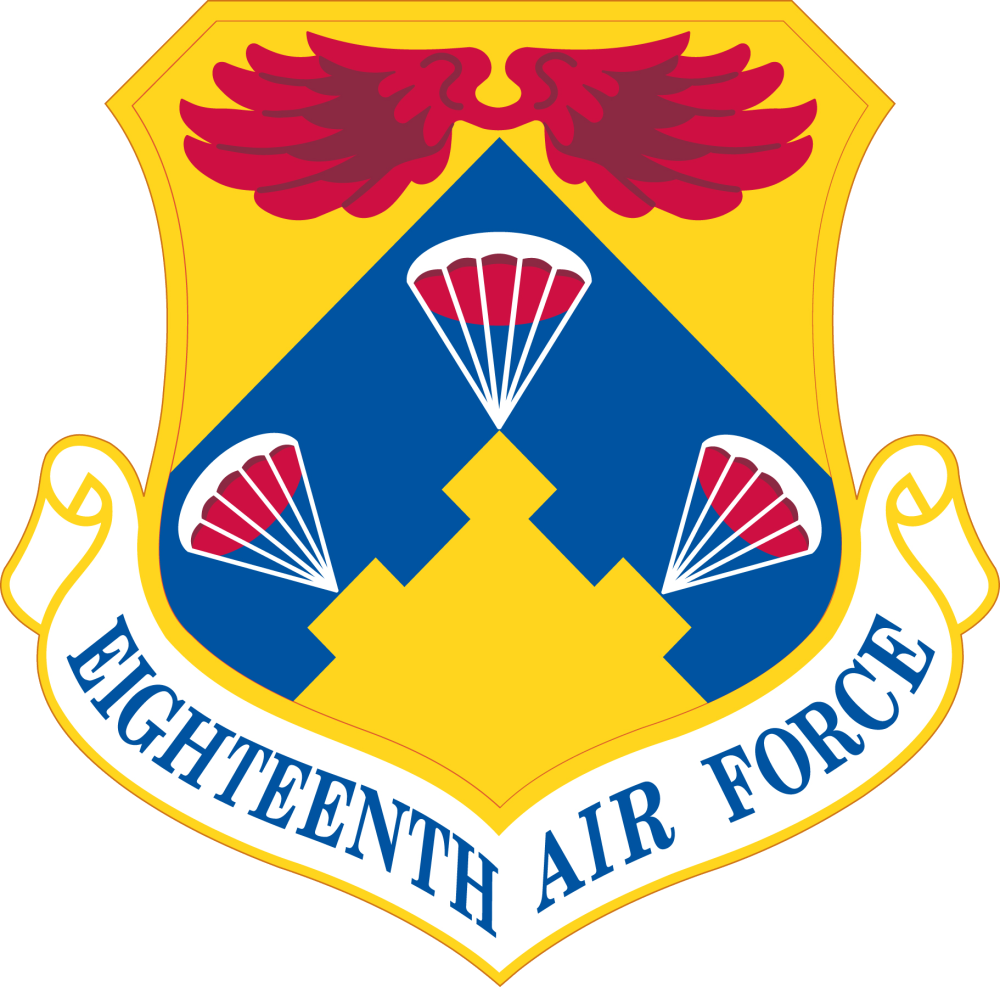
- Shield of the Eighteenth Air Force
- Active: 6 January 2019 – Present (as Eighteenth Air Force); 1 April 2007 – 6 January 2019 (as Eighteenth Air Force (Air Forces Transportation)); 1 October 2003 – 1 April 2007; 26 June 1951 – 1 January 1958 (as Eighteenth Air Force); 7 March 1951 – 26 June 1951 (as Eighteenth Air Force (Troop Carrier)) (74 years, 8 months)
- Country: United States of America
- Branch: United States Air Force
- Type: Numbered Air Force
- Role: Provide combat-ready air mobility forces to U.S. Transportation Command
- Part of: Air Mobility Command; U.S. Transportation Command
- Headquarters: Scott Air Force Base, Illinois, U.S.
- Decorations: Air Force Outstanding Unit Award
- Website: www.18af.amc.af.mil

Commanders
- Commander: Maj Gen Charles D. Bolton
- Vice Commander: Col Patrick C. Winstead
- Command Chief: CMSgt Thomas W. Blount
- Notable commanders: Col Earl Young

Eighteenth Air Force (18 AF) is one of two Numbered Air Forces (NAF) in Air Mobility Command (AMC) and one of the largest NAFs in the United States Air Force. Eighteenth Air Force was activated on 28 March 1951, inactivated on 1 January 1958, and re-activated on 1 October 2003. It is headquartered at Scott Air Force Base, Illinois.

== Overview ==
As one of AMC's numbered air forces, 18 AF ensures readiness and sustainment of approximately 33,000 active duty, Air Force Reserve, and civilian Airmen at 12 wings. With more than 400 aircraft, Eighteenth Air Force supports AMC's worldwide mission of providing rapid global mobility to America's armed forces through airlift, aerial refueling, and aeromedical evacuation.

The command's mobility aircraft include the C-5 Galaxy, C-17 Globemaster III, C-130 Hercules, KC-46 Pegasus, and KC-135 Stratotanker. Operational support aircraft are the VC-25 (Boeing 747 / Air Force One), C-21, C-20B (Gulfstream III), C-32A (Boeing 757) , C-37A (Gulfstream V) , C-37B (Gulfstream 550) and C-40B (Boeing 737) .

18 AF has an assigned military and civilian workforce of more than 33,000 personnel.

== Units ==
Units reporting to 18 AF include 9 wings.

Other AMC units assigned to 18 AF are:

- Airlift Wings

62d Airlift Wing, C-17A

Joint Base Lewis-McChord (McChord AFB), Washington

89th Airlift Wing,

VC-25A (Air Force One), C-20B (Gulfstream III), C-32A (Boeing 757), C-37A (Gulfstream V), C-40B (Boeing 737)
Joint Base Andrews (Andrews AFB), Maryland

317th Airlift Wing, C-130J

Dyess AFB, Texas

- Air Mobility Wings

60th Air Mobility Wing, C-5M, C-17A, KC-46A

Travis AFB, California

375th Air Mobility Wing, C-21, C-40, KC-135R

Scott AFB, Illinois

- Air Refueling Wings

22d Air Refueling Wing, KC-135R, KC-46A

McConnell AFB, Kansas

92d Air Refueling Wing, KC-135R

Fairchild AFB, Washington

- Air Mobility Operations Wings

521st Air Mobility Wing

Ramstein Air Base, Germany

- Air Base Groups

627th Air Base Group

Joint Base Lewis-McChord (McChord AFB), Washington

=== 618th Air Operations Center ===
Formerly under 18 AF, now directly under AMC, the 618th Air Operations Center (Tanker Airlift Control Center), located at Scott AFB, serves as the organization's air operations center, planning and directing tanker and transport aircraft operations around the world. It is stationed at Scott Air Force Base, Illinois. The 618 AOC (TACC) is responsible for planning, scheduling, and tracking aircraft performing airlift, aerial refueling, and aeromedical evacuation operations around the world. It serves as an Air Operations Center (AOC) for AMC, executing missions assigned by the United States Transportation Command (USTRANSCOM).

The 618 AOC (TACC), initially known as TACC, became operational on 1 April 1992. Air mobility leadership sought to simplify the execution of the worldwide mobility mission. They created a highly efficient organization to centralize command and control operations that previously resided within numbered air forces and airlift divisions. TACC was redesignated as the 618 TACC on 1 April 2007, and remained under that designation until being renamed the 618 AOC (TACC) on 30 August 2010. AMC extensively reorganized the 618 AOC in 2020 and reassigned it from 18 AF to the AMC Directorate of Operations, Strategic Deterrence, and Nuclear Integration (AMC/A3).

== History ==
=== Origins ===
When the Army Air Forces (AAF) reorganized in 1946, Tactical Air Command (TAC) was established as one of its three major commands. The AAF IX Troop Carrier Command (TCC) was inactivated as part of this reorganization and Third Air Force was reassigned to TAC to control the troop carrier units formerly part of IX TCC. It was headquartered at Greenville Army Airfield, South Carolina. The C-46 Commando and C-47 Skytrain were the primary troop carrier aircraft, but surplus C-54 Skymasters that had been originally purchased for the Air Transport Command (ATC) were made available for troop carrier use.

Third Air Force was inactivated on 1 November 1946 and TAC's troop carrier mission was reassigned to Ninth Air Force which moved to Greenville. In 1947, many of TAC's Troop Carrier Groups/Wings were assigned directly to Headquarters TAC with the rest to the Air Defense Command's Fourteenth Air Force reserve 302d Troop Carrier Wing. The theater troop carrier mission was expanded rapidly during the Korean War when many of these reserve units were called into active service and assigned directly to HQ TAC.

=== Cold War ===
Eighteenth Air Force was established and activated 28 March 1951 to discharge Tactical Air Command's (TAC) troop carrier responsibilities. The organization became operational on 1 June 1951 at Donaldson AFB, South Carolina and initially assumed control of nine medium C-119 Flying Boxcar troop carrier wings (314th, 375th, 403d, 433d, 434th, 435th, 443d, 514th and 515th), seven of which were Air Force Reserve wings called to active duty during the Korean War.

The command added a heavy (C-124 Globemaster) wing, the 62nd Troop Carrier Wing, in Fall 1951 and another in early 1953, the 63rd Troop Carrier Wing.

In the spring of 1952, 18 AF C-124 Globemasters were sent to Japan and by July 1952, C-124s from the 22nd Troop Carrier Squadron were flying missions in South Korea. The arrival of the C-124 introduced the aircraft loadmaster position to the troop carrier mission. As the Korean War wound down, C-119 Flying Boxcar crews from the 483rd Troop Carrier Wing began supporting French operations in Indochina. United States Air Force-supplied C-47 Skytrain and C-119s were placed "on-loan" to the French Air Force at Tourane Air Base.

By early 1953, the Air Force Reserve wings were replaced by active duty wings organized, administered, equipped, trained, and prepared for combat by 18 AF. Augmented troop carrier forces in the Far East and Europe provided trained crews and replacement personnel to units in the Korean War.

The next year, 18 AF C-119s from the 483rd Troop Carrier Wing (and flown by civilian crews employed by Civil Air Transport) airdropped supplies to besieged French paratroops at Dien Bien Phu, Indochina. Some 483rd personnel flew missions in an unofficial capacity and would play key roles in the troop carrier mission in later years. After the Battle of Dien Bien Phu, 374th Troop Carrier Wing and TAC C-124s airlifted wounded French soldiers out of Indochina to Japan.

The command also took part in joint exercises and provided support for airborne paratroop training all the while working to improve communications capabilities and to advocate for the inclusion of medical air evacuation in joint exercises. 18 AF also provided airlift support to other Air Force major commands and TAC organizations.

The advent of the jet age saw TAC with a new mission, as it became the focal point for a new military philosophy based on the rapid deployment of heavily armed fighter/bomber units and Army airborne and light infantry units to overseas "trouble spots" before conflicts could escalate into full-scale war. 18 AF units supplemented Military Air Transport Service (MATS) airlift when needed and transported U.S. Army and U.S. Air Force units for training and deployment.

The Korean War illustrated the need for a medium transport capable of operating from dirt airstrips, which led to the development of several new transport aircraft, including the delivery of the jet-prop powered C-130 Hercules at the end of 1956. 18 AF also took deliveries of the Fairchild C-123 Provider, a twin-engine transport designed for assault operations into rudimentary landing zones.

With the advent of the C-130, TAC established the Composite Air Strike Force, commonly known as a CASF, which was centered on troop carrier C-130s supplemented by MATS aircraft to deliver personnel and cargo at a moment's notice to support TAC fighter/bombers at overseas destinations. With these new aircraft, 18 AF units rotated troop carrier units to Europe in support of NATO.

The command was heavily committed to airlift operations in Arctic areas beginning in the Fall of 1952. Between 1955 and 1957, the command offloaded and airdropped equipment supporting the construction of the Distant Early Warning Line (DEW Line) radar system across northern Canada. Helicopters of the 310th Troop Carrier Squadron, operating from two icebreakers, provided support airlift to the U.S. Navy in the HIRAN (High Precision Air Navigation) project in January 1956. The command provided airlift and airlift expertise to the U.S. Navy in the Antarctic Operation Deep Freeze I and II, establishing a base at the South Pole. Crews of the 63rd Troop Carrier Wing performed the first airdrop at the South Pole in October 1956. A combat controller of the 1st Aerial Port Squadron performed the first parachute jump at the South Pole in November 1956 (in order to determine the necessary corrections for ongoing airdrops of equipment). 18 AF also provided airdrop and air-land support to Alaskan Air Command and Northeast Air Command, from March to early June 1957 in order to establish similar sites on ice islands in north polar regions.

The command was also instrumental in the development of the aerial port concept, including techniques and equipment for loading troop carrier aircraft and the airdrop of cargo.

18 AF Airmen also developed the Air Force "pathfinder" combat controller capability to establish ground-to-air communications and navigation aids at jump sites and to select landing sites. They also carried out fixed-wing assault missions using C-123 aircraft for landing on small unimproved landing areas. The command organized the first rotary assault group in the U.S. Air Force before losing the mission to the U.S. Army and served as an advisory body for reserve troop carrier wings. Finally, the command was also heavily involved in the testing of new aerial delivery equipment, equipment and techniques for dropping paratroops and cargo, and navigation devices to determine the point of release.

A realignment of Troop Carrier forces in 1957 led to the reassignment of 18 AF's C-124 wings to MATS and its headquarters was moved to James Connally AFB, Texas on 1 September. At the same time, Donaldson AFB was turned over to MATS (along with the C-124s and 63d TCW assigned there). At Connally AFB, the command gained responsibility for TAC's day fighter, fighter-bomber, and aerial tanker operations on western U.S. bases.

18 AF was inactivated effective 1 January 1958 due to budgetary reasons, and its units were reassigned to Twelfth Air Force (which had been reassigned from U.S. Air Forces Europe at Ramstein Air Base, West Germany to James Connally AFB).

=== Air Mobility Command ===
18 AF was reactivated on 1 October 2003 as part of an overall AMC reorganization. Born from the consolidation of AMC's 15th and 21st Air Forces under the leadership of Maj Gen Bill Essex, AMC'S director of plans and programs, the command had a modest restart. By the time Lt Gen William Welser III was finally confirmed as commander a mere two months after reactivation, the 18 AF headquarters staff numbered 30 (of which more than half was the legal office).

At that time, every AMC wing and independent group reported to the 18 AF, including the newly designated 15th Expeditionary Mobility Task Force and 21st Expeditionary Mobility Task Force, AMC's lead agencies for conducting airlift, air refueling, aeromedical evacuation, and expeditionary combat support operations worldwide. This meant that a single commander, the 18 AF commander, had tasking and execution authority for all air mobility missions. It became quickly apparent that in order for the command to effectively oversee the global air mobility enterprise it would have to grow and develop strong relationships with key organizations across the Air Force and United States Department of Defense.

In November 2005, Maj Gen James A. Hawkins, a former 18 AF vice commander, took the reins of the 18 AF. Under his leadership, and that of his successor, Maj Gen Winfield W. Scott III, who took command in June 2008, the command continued to evolve to meet complex missions at home and abroad.

One of the most demanding of those missions came when Hurricane Katrina made landfall on the Gulf Coast in August 2005, eventually causing more than 1,800 deaths and nearly $80 billion in damage over an area of approximately 90,000 square miles. From the initial response through recovery, 18 AF Airmen were part of a massive total force team that flew more than 300 missions that moved nearly 1,800 sick and injured hurricane victims to safety and airlifted more than 4,000 tons of relief supplies to the stricken area.

A mere two years afterward, the command also flexed its muscle overseas with the deployment of approximately 1,500 Mine-Resistant Ambush Protected (MRAP) vehicles to Iraq in only four months.

On 6 January 2011, AMC reassigned five units from 18 AF to the United States Air Force Expeditionary Center (USAFEC) at Joint Base McGuire-Dix-Lakehurst, New Jersey. Included in the transition were the 87th Air Base Wing at Joint Base MDL, the 628th Air Base Wing at Joint Base Charleston, South Carolina, the 627th Air Base Group at Joint Base Lewis-McChord, Washington, the 43rd Airlift Group at Pope Army Air Field, North Carolina and the 319th Air Refueling Wing at Grand Forks Air Force Base, North Dakota.

The 18 AF Commander, Lt Gen Robert Allardice at the time, retained operational control of Airmen in these units, but the change reduced his administrative burden, allowing him greater focus on the command's worldwide mobility flying operations. The need for that focus had become obvious over the years, reflected in a doubling of the 18 AF's headquarters staff between 2003 and 2010. During the same time, the headquarters also added Operations and Plans directorates as well as an integration cell to leverage other key AMC staff members performing operational tasks supporting the command's mission.

While the 2011 restructuring was one of the most visible elements of an evolutionary process that enhanced the 18 AF's operational capability, it was far from the last. The following year the command went through one of its most significant restructuring efforts to date.

In March 2012, the 18 AF inactivated its two Expeditionary Mobility Task Forces: the 21st Expeditionary Mobility Task Force at Joint Base McGuire-Dix-Lakehurst, New Jersey and the 15th Expeditionary Mobility Task Force at Travis Air Force Base, California. These inactivations administratively aligned the task forces' subordinate units, the 615th Contingency Response Wing at Travis, the 621st Contingency Response Wing at Joint Base MDL, the 515th Air Mobility Operations Wing at Joint Base Pearl Harbor–Hickam, Hawaii, and the 521st Air Mobility Operations Wing at Ramstein Air Base, Germany under the U.S. Air Force Expeditionary Center (USAFEC). The following June also saw the inactivation of the 615 CRW, with the alignment of its subordinate units under the 621 CRW.

While the changes reduced the administrative demands on the 18 AF commander, they still left him with full operational control of AMC's forces. Lt Gen Mark Ramsay, then-18 AF Commander, noted that the changes represented a more effective and efficient way of carrying out the command's global air mobility mission "especially the planning, exercising, execution, and assessment of airlift, air refueling, and aeromedical evacuation operations in support of combatant commanders across the globe."

In the wake of Japan's 2011 earthquake and tsunami, the command orchestrated efforts transporting hundreds of tons of humanitarian relief while assuring the safe return of thousands of military families back to the U.S. Simultaneously, within hours of the passing of a Security Council Resolution, AMC tanker units rapidly formed the 313th Air Expeditionary Wing, a total force "Calico wing" (so named for the variety of aircraft tail flashes from the different units that constituted it) to support the U.S. Operation Odyssey Dawn over Libya, which later became the NATO Operation Unified Protector. All this occurred against the backdrop of the massive movement of personnel and equipment from Iraq.

Since that time, the command has continued to rapidly respond to crises across the globe whether delivering relief supplies to Americans stricken by Superstorm Sandy, moving troops and equipment in the face of provocations by North Korea and Syria, or supporting international efforts battling extremists in Mali and the Central African Republic. At the same time, the command has undertaken the effort of redeploying equipment and troops from Afghanistan.

In 2020, HQ Air Mobility Command restructured its command and control authorities, pulling operational control (OPCON) back to the AMC Commander. With the change, 18 AF lost the designation of Air Forces Transportation and reverted from a Component-NAF (C-NAF) to a standard NAF.

=== Lineage ===
- Established as Eighteenth Air Force (Troop Carrier) on 7 March 1951.

Organized on 28 March 1951.
Redesignated Eighteenth Air Force on 26 June 1951.
Inactivated on 1 January 1958.

- Activated on 1 October 2003.
- Redesignated Eighteenth Air Force (Air Forces Transportation) on 1 April 2007.
- Redesignated Eighteenth Air Force on 6 January 2019

==== Assignments ====
- Tactical Air Command, 28 March 1951 – 1 January 1958.
- Air Mobility Command, 1 October 2003 – Present

==== Components ====
===== Divisions =====
- 42d Air Division: 1 October 1957 – 1 January 1958

Bergstrom AFB, Texas

- 831st Air Division: 8 October 1957 – 1 January 1958

George AFB, California

- 832d Air Division: 8 October 1957 – 1 January 1958

Cannon AFB, New Mexico

- 834th Airlift Division: 1 October 1957 – 1 January 1958

England AFB, Louisiana

===== Wings =====
- 62d Troop Carrier Wing: 17 September 1951 – 1 July 1957
- 63d Troop Carrier Wing: 8 January 1953 – 1 July 1957.
- 64th Troop Carrier Wing: 14 July 1952 – 21 July 1954.
- 313th Troop Carrier Wing: 1 February – 25 August 1953.
- 314th Troop Carrier Wing: 1 June 1951 – 1 September 1957.
- 375th Troop Carrier Wing: 1 June 1951 – 14 July 1952
- 403d Troop Carrier Wing: 1 June 1951 – 1 January 1953

(detached 14 April 1952 – 1 January 1953).

- 433d Troop Carrier Wing: 1 June – 8 August 1951.
- 434th Troop Carrier Wing: 1 June 1951 – 1 February 1953
- 435th Troop Carrier Wing: 1 June 1951 – 1 December 1952
- 443d Troop Carrier Wing: 1 June 1951 – 8 January 1953.
- 456th Troop Carrier Wing: 1 December 1952 – 9 July 1956.
- 463d Troop Carrier Wing: 16 January 1953 – 1 September 1957
- 464th Troop Carrier Wing: 1 February 1953 – 1 September 1957.
- 465th Troop Carrier Wing: 25 August 1953 – 1 April 1954.
- 514th Troop Carrier Wing: 1 June 1951 – 1 February 1953.
- 516th Troop Carrier Wing: 1 June 1951 – 1 January 1958.
- 312th Fighter-Bomber Wing: 1–8 October 1957.
- 450th Fighter-Day Wing: 1 October 1957 – 1 January 1958.
- 479th Fighter-Day Wing: 1–8 October 1957

(413th Fighter-Day Group attached to 479th FDW)

- 506th Fighter-Day Wing: 1 October 1957 – 1 January 1958.

===== Groups =====
- 309th Troop Carrier Group: 8 July 1955 – 2 June 1956 (detached 8 July 1955 – May 1956)

Assigned to: Ardmore AFB, Oklahoma (USAFR), C-122, C-123

==== Stations ====
- Greenville AFB (later, Donaldson AFB), South Carolina, 28 March 1951
- James Connally AFB, Texas, 1 September 1957 – 1 January 1958
- Scott AFB, Illinois, 1 October 2003 – present.

==== Aircraft Assigned ====
- C-45 Expeditor, 1951, 1954–1955
- C-46 Commando, 1951–1954
- C-47 Skytrain, 1951–1953
- C-82 Packet, 1951–1953
- C-119 Flying Boxcar, 1951–1957
- YC-122 Avitruc, 1951–1955
- C-124 Globemaster II, 1951–1957
- C-54 Skymaster, 1952
- C-123 Provider, 1955–1957
- C-130 Hercules, 1956–1957; 2003–present
- C-5 Galaxy, 2003–present
- C-9 Nightingale, 2003–2005
- C-141 Starlifter, 2003–2006
- C-17 Globemaster III, 2003–present
- KC-135 Stratotanker, 2003–present
- KC-10 Extender, 2003–2024
- KC-46A Pegasus, 2020-present
- VC-25, 2003–present
- C-32, 2003–present
- C-20, 2003–present
- C-37, 2003–present
- C-40 Clipper, 2003–present
- F-84 Thunderjet, 1957–1958
- F-86 Sabre, 1957
- F-100 Super Sabre, 1957–1958
- F-101 Voodoo, 1957–1958
- KB-29 Superfortress (Tanker), 1957
- KB-50 Superfortress (Tanker), 1957–1958
- B-26 Invader, 1957–1958
- B-45 Tornado, 1957
- B-57 Canberra, 1957–1958

== List of commanders ==
| No. | Commander | | Term | | |
| No. | Portrait | Name | Took office | Left office | Term length |
|---|---|---|---|---|---|
| 1 | William Welser III | Lieutenant General; William Welser III | 1 October 2003 | 29 November 2005 | 2 years, 59 days |
| 2 | James A. Hawkins | Major General; James A. Hawkins | 29 November 2005 | 24 June 2008 | 2 years, 208 days |
| 3 | Winfield W. Scott III | Major General; Winfield W. Scott III | 24 June 2008 | 19 August 2009 | 1 year, 56 days |
| 4 | Robert R. Allardice | Lieutenant General; Robert R. Allardice | 19 August 2009 | September 2011 | ~2 years, 13 days |
| 5 | Mark F. Ramsay | Lieutenant General; Mark F. Ramsay | September 2011 | August 2012 | ~335 days |
| 6 | Darren W. McDew | Lieutenant General; Darren W. McDew | August 2012 | April 2014 | ~1 year, 243 days |
| 7 | Carlton D. Everhart II | Lieutenant General; Carlton D. Everhart II | June 2014 | August 2015 | ~1 year, 61 days |
| 8 | Thomas Sharpy | Major General; Thomas Sharpy | August 2015 | October 2015 | ~61 days |
| 9 | Samuel D. Cox | Lieutenant General; Samuel D. Cox | October 2015 | 1 June 2017 | ~1 year, 243 days |
| 10 | Giovanni K. Tuck | Lieutenant General; Giovanni K. Tuck | 1 June 2017 | 31 July 2018 | 1 year, 60 days |
| 11 | Sam C. Barrett | Major General; Sam C. Barrett | 31 July 2018 | 18 August 2020 | 2 years, 18 days |
| 12 | Kenneth Bibb | Major General; Kenneth Bibb | 18 August 2020 | 19 August 2022 | 2 years, 1 day |
| 13 | Corey Martin | Major General; Corey Martin | 19 August 2022 | 9 August 2024 | 1 year, 356 days |
| 14 | Charles D. Bolton | Major General; Charles D. Bolton | 9 August 2024 | Incumbent | 1 year, 91 days |
