= 97th Air Mobility Wing =

Unit of the US Air Force, Air Education and Training Command

97th Air Mobility Wing

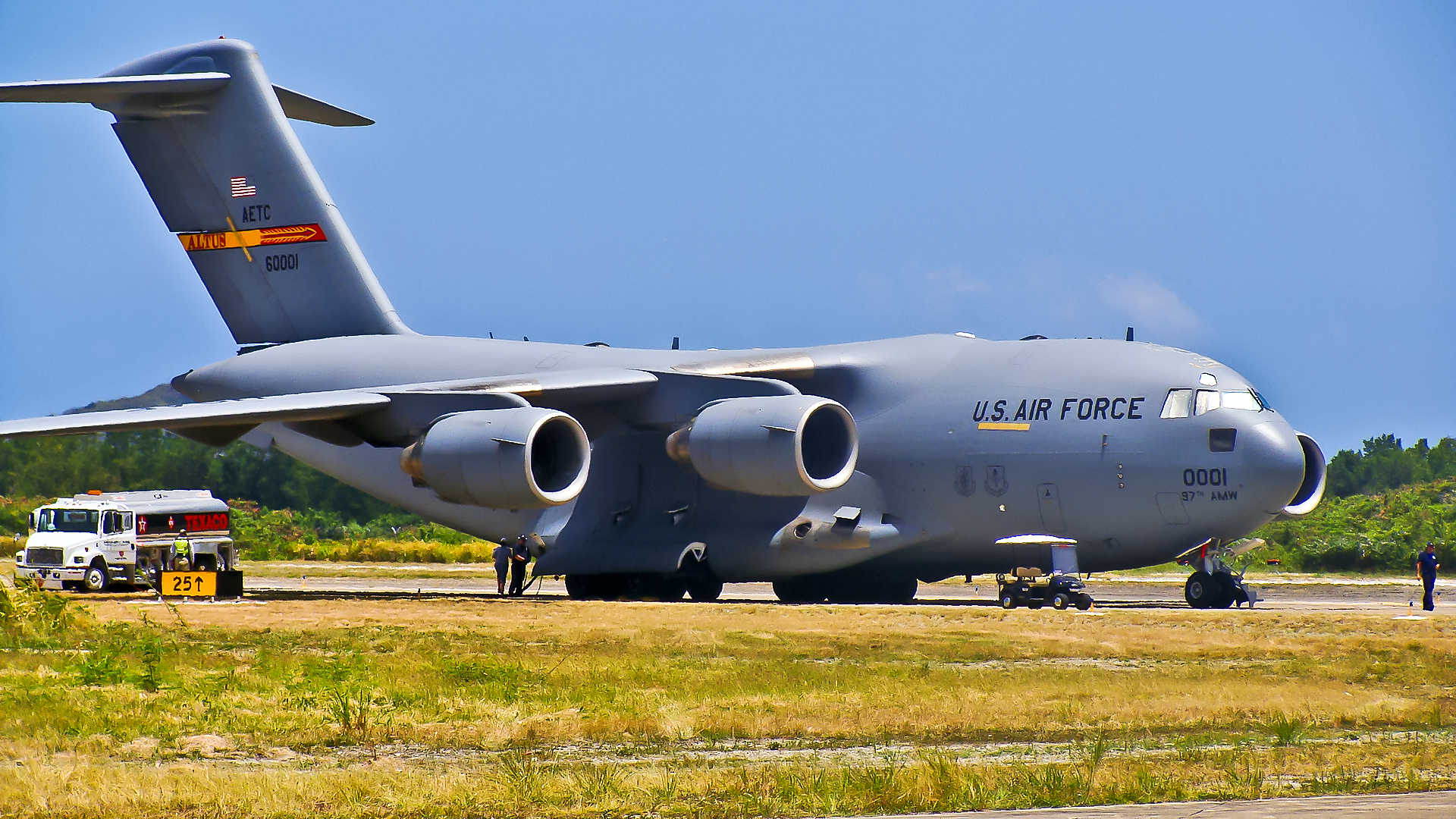
- 97th Air Mobility Wing C-17 Globemaster III
- Active: 1947–1992; 1992–present
- Country: United States
- Branch: United States Air Force
- Role: Airlift and air refueling training
- Part of: Air Education and Training Command
- Garrison/HQ: Altus Air Force Base, Oklahoma.
- Decorations: Air Force Outstanding Unit Award

Commanders
- Current Commander: Colonel Richard K. Kind
- Vice Commander: Colonel Joshua A. Moores
- Command Chief: CMSgt Jonny Adams
- Notable commanders: John Dale Ryan; Jacob E. Smart; Carlton D. Everhart II

Insignia
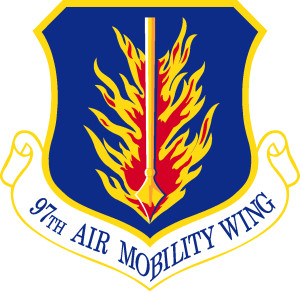
- 97th Air Mobility Wing emblem (Note: Approved 2 May 1957.)

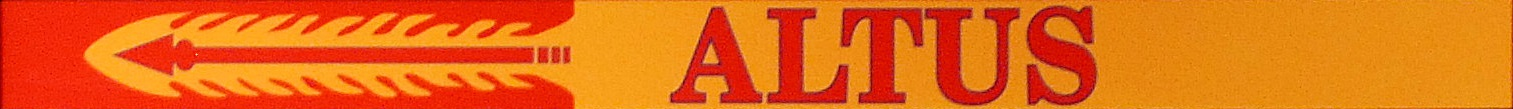
- Tail Stripe

The 97th Air Mobility Wing is a United States Air Force unit assigned to Nineteenth Air Force of Air Education and Training Command. It is stationed at Altus Air Force Base, Oklahoma. The wing is also the host unit at Altus. It plans and executes McDonnell Douglas C-17 Globemaster III, Boeing KC-46 Pegasus, and Boeing KC-135 Stratotanker pilot and aircrew training, providing formal school initial and advanced specialty training programs for up to 3,000 students annually. The training is done in a three-phase approach: Academic Phase, Simulator Phase, and Flying Phase.

The 97th Air Mobility Wing is commanded by Colonel Jeffrey M. Marshall with Vice Commander as Colonel Adam H. Rosado, and the Command Chief Master Sergeant is Chief Master Sergeant Justin R. Brundage. The wing's operational mission is, in conjunction with its training mission, to have its instructor force maintain operational currency so that they, as highly qualified combat-ready aircrew members, can deploy to augment worldwide contingencies. The 97th maintains approximately 500 mobility personnel ready to deploy all over the world in a moment's notice in support of national interests.

== Units ==
Today the 97th Air Mobility Wing consists of the following major units:

- 97th Operations Group Plans and executes C-17, KC-46, and KC-135 formal school (initial and advanced) specialty training programs for up to 3,000 students annually. Sustains C-17, KC,-46, and KC-135 airland, airdrop and air refueling mobility forces providing global reach for combat and contingency operations. Provides air traffic control and weather forecasting for flying operations.
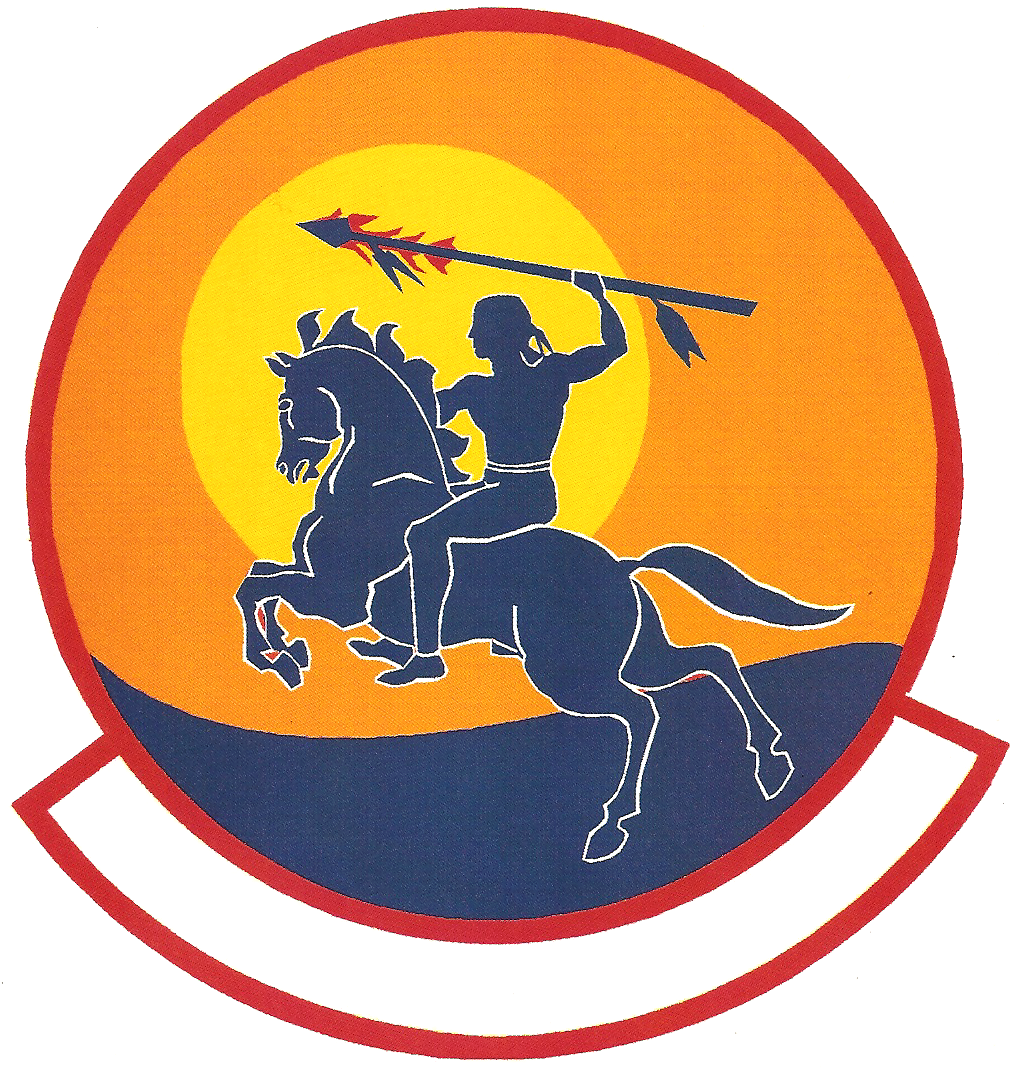
  - 97th Operations Support Squadron Activated as the 1709th Training Squadron under the 1707th Air Transport Group in September 1952 at Palm Beach Air Force Base, Florida. The squadron provides direct mission support to all operational units assigned to the 97th Air Mobility Wing. Provides air traffic services, weather, airfield management, intelligence, life support, tactics, flight records, scheduling, and current operations services. Manages and provides administrative support for active duty, reserves, and international students at the command's airlift and tanker training center.
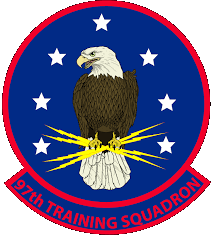
  - 97th Training Squadron Manages the 97th Air Mobility Wing's $1.01-billion contracted aircrew training program for more than 350-plus assigned instructors and as many as 2,100 C-17, KC-135, and KC-46 students.
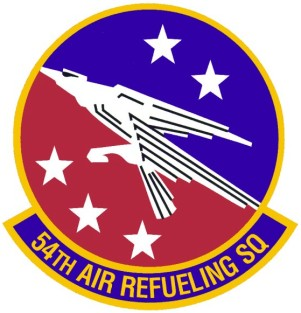
  - 54th Air Refueling Squadron – KC-135R Stratotanker
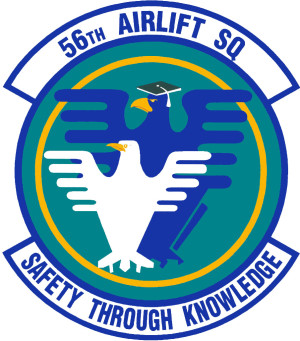
  - 56th Air Refueling Squadron – KC-46A Pegasus
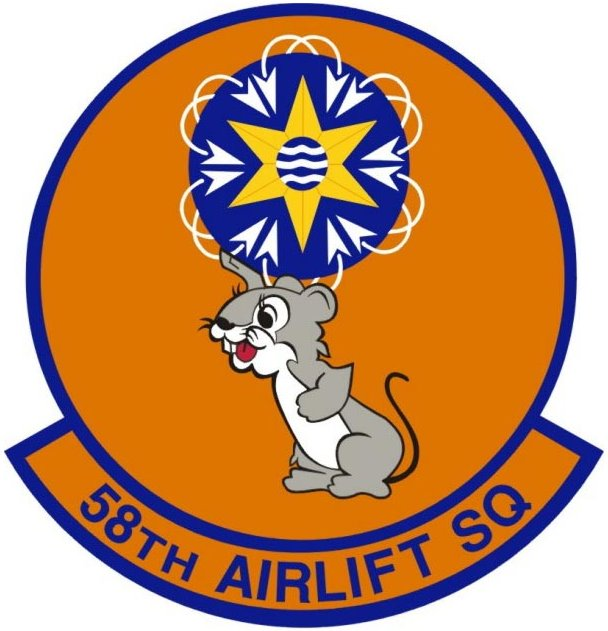
  - 58th Airlift Squadron – C-17A Globemaster III
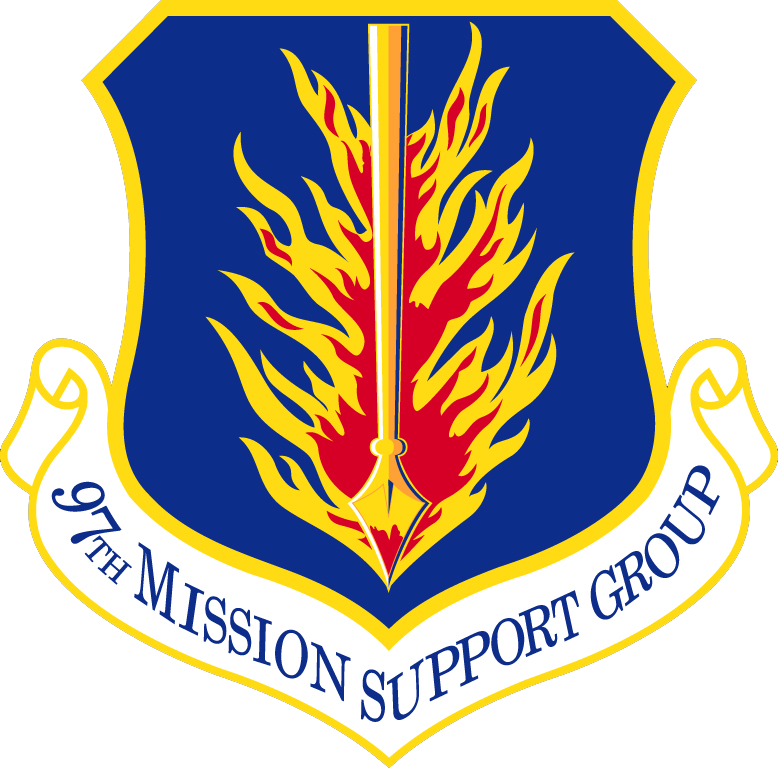
- 97th Mission Support Group, Provides mission, infrastructure, and community quality-of-life support for personnel and all assigned organizations on Altus AFB. Supports worldwide USAF taskings with deployment-ready personnel and equipment.
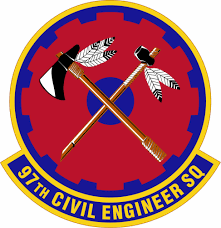
  - 97th Civil Engineer Squadron
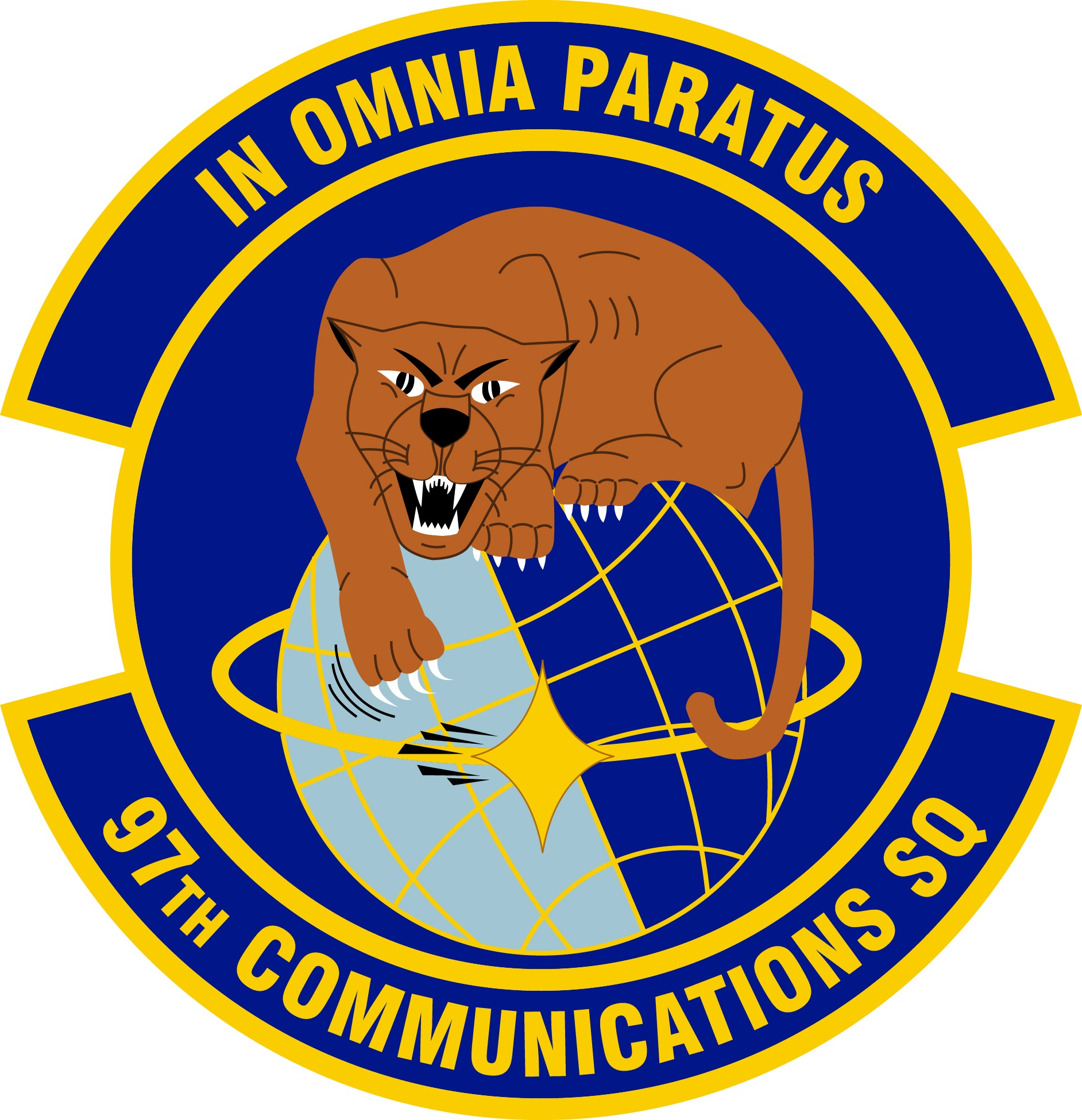
  - 97th Communications Squadron
  - 97th Force Support Squadron
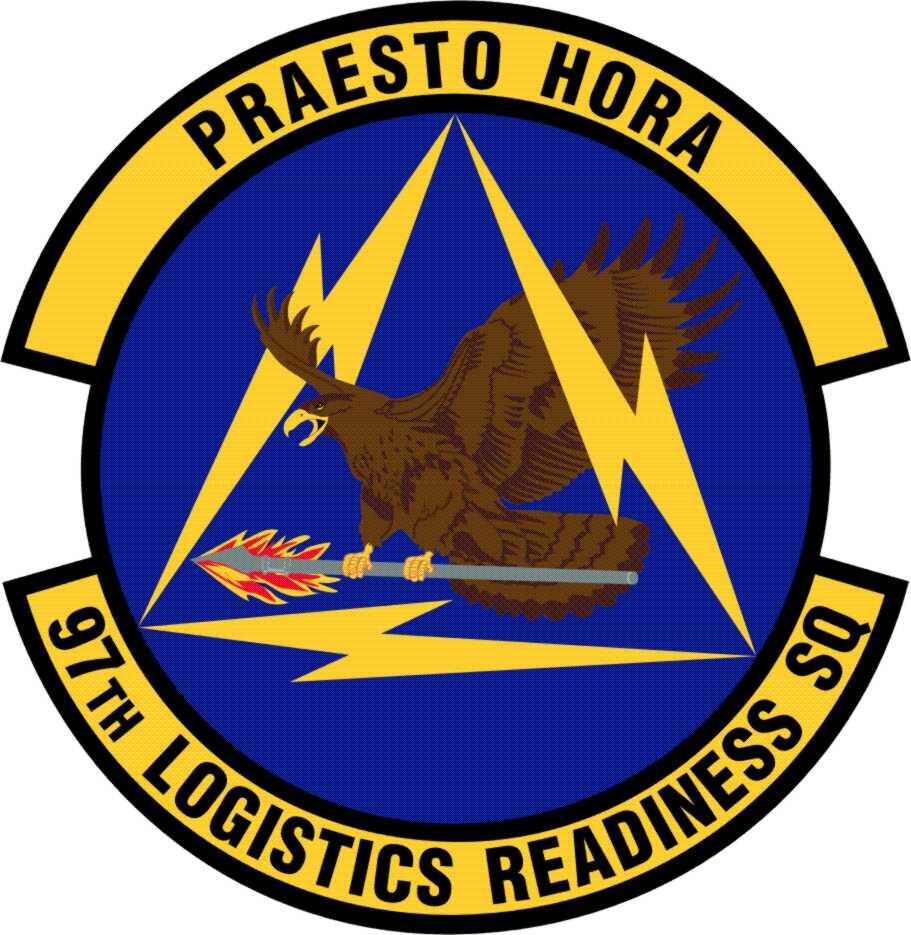
  - 97th Logistics Readiness Squadron
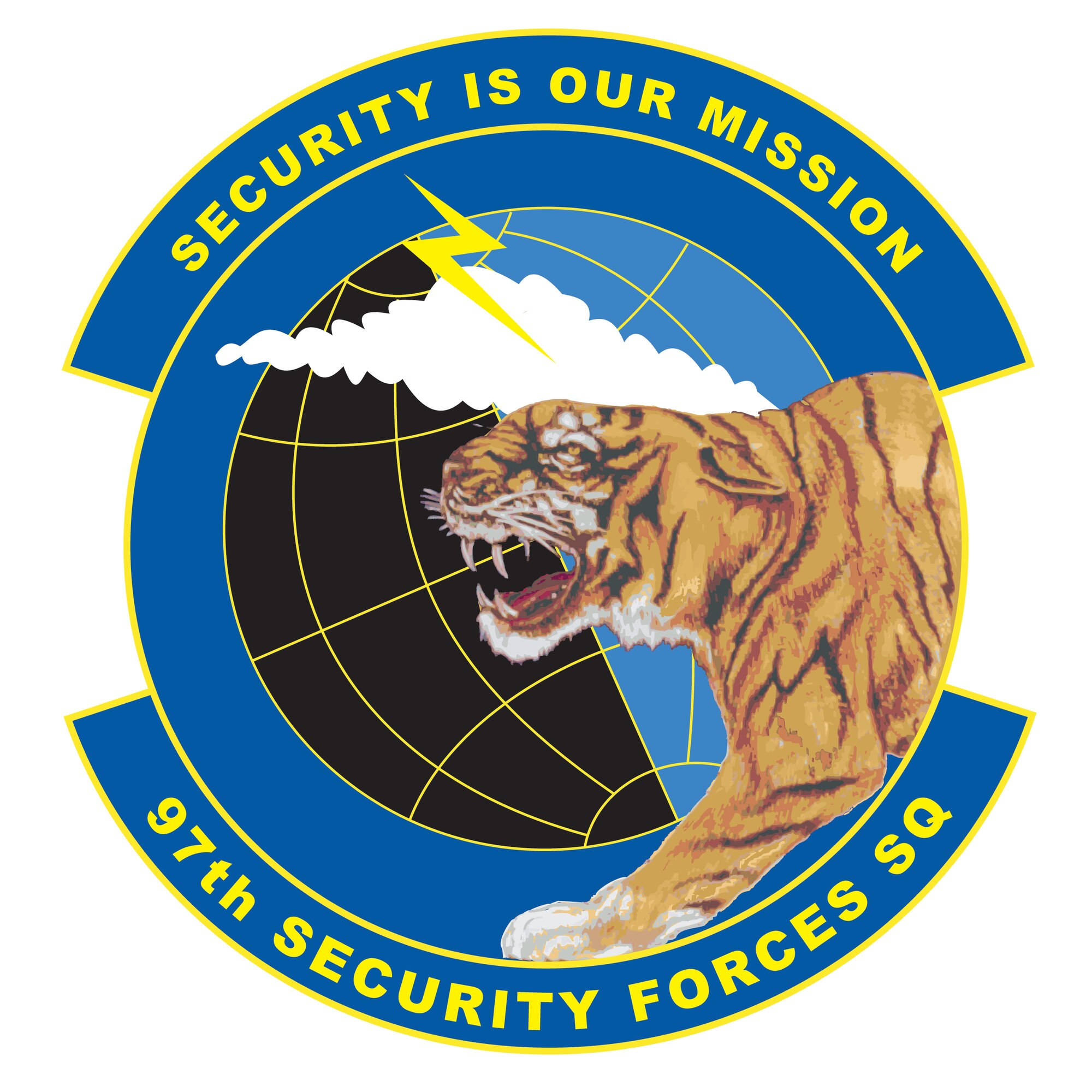
  - 97th Security Forces Squadron
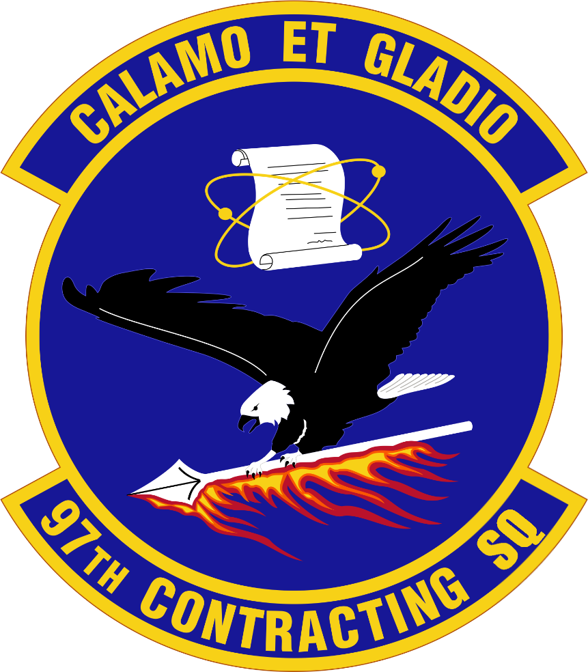
  - 97th Contracting Squadron
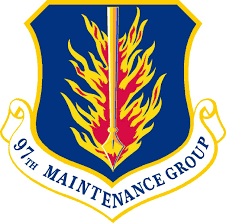
- 97th Maintenance Group Provides maintenance and support to all KC-135R, KC-46, and C-17 aircraft and provide the same maintenance support to transient aircraft, engines and associated ground equipment. To provide backshop support to both aircraft, allowing the 97th Air Mobility Wing to perform its aircrew training mission.
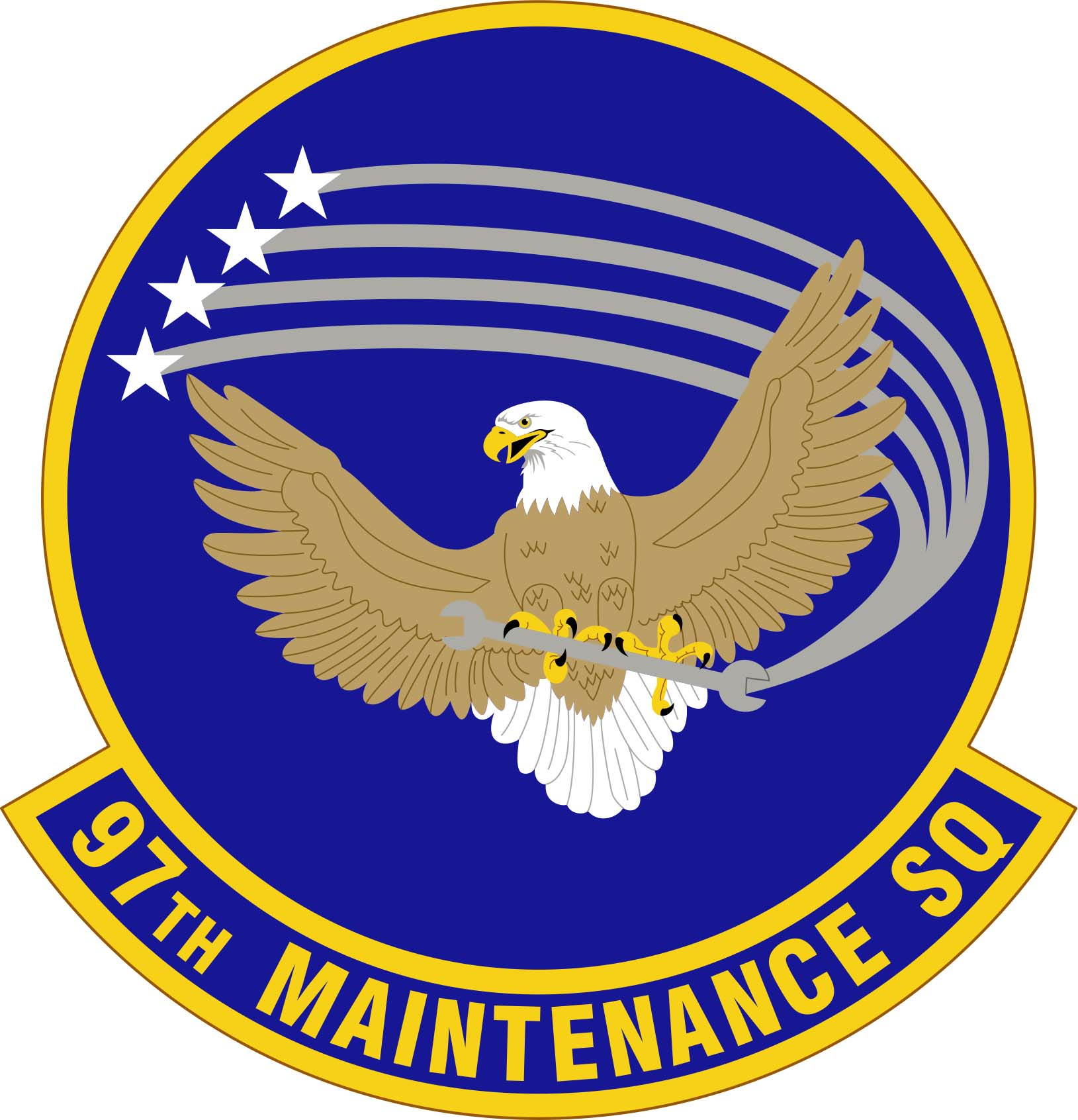
  - 97th Maintenance Squadron
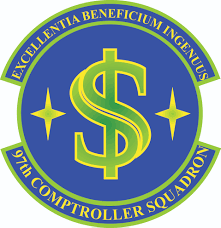
- 97th Comptroller Squadron

== History ==
=== Cold War ===
Established as the 97 Bombardment Wing, Very Heavy, on 11 Sep 1947. Organized on 1 December 1947 at Mile 26 Field (later Eielson Air Force Base), Alaska. The wing was assigned to Fifteenth Air Force ogStrategic Air Command (SAC), although the Yukon Sector of the Alaskan Air Command controlled its operations. The 97th was organized in 1947 during the test of the Wing Base Organization, composed of the 97th Bombardment Group and support elements transferred from the 519th Air Service Group.

This organization gave the wing commander the authority to direct activities rather than merely request support from the base support group commander. Operational squadrons of the 97th Bombardment Wing were the 340th, 341st and 342d Bombardment Squadrons, which were assigned to the 97th Bombardment Group.

The 97th was originally a test organization, made up of the 97th Bombardment Group and three support groups organized from elements of the 519th Air Service Group, which had deployed to Mile 26 Field from Smoky Hill Army Air Field, Kansas. The Air Force was conducting a service test of the wing base structure that elevated the wing headquarters to the highest echelon of command on the base. This gave the wing commander the authority to direct activities rather than merely request that his flying mission receive support.

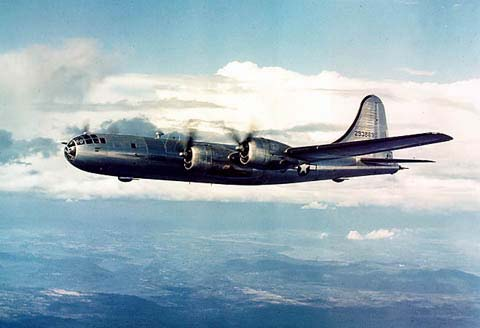
Boeing B-29 Superfortress

The wing consisted of a combat group, an airdrome group, a maintenance and supply group, and a medical group. The unit's March 1948 history stated: "The mission of the 97th Bombardment Wing is to man, train, and maintain a self-sustaining strategic bombardment group capable of operations in any theater." While in Alaska), the 97th flew Boeing B-29 Superfortress training missions over the Arctic Ocean, testing the aircraft and maintenance crews in the harsh climate. At the end of the Alaskan deployment the wing returned to Smoky Hill Air Force Base, near Salina, Kansas, in March 1948.

Throughout its existence the 97th Bombardment Wing contributed to the deterrence of nuclear war with the former Soviet Union by being prepared to execute Emergency War Order assignments. It continually demonstrated its resolve in the same manner as other SAC bombardment wings, primarily by maintaining the Operation Chrome Dome aerial-alert capability and by keeping crews on ground alert, capable of launching bomber sorties within minutes. The wing's tankers participated in the Atlantic, Pacific, European, and Alaskan Tanker Task Forces, ensuring that the bombers would be able to reach their targets. Until the Soviet Union's demise in 1989 the crews of the 97th trained for war, unless other world events demanded their attention.

=== Consolidation ===
While at Smoky Hill, the wing was attached to the 301st Bombardment Wing, Very Heavy, for further training and to assist the 301st prepare for its upcoming move to Germany. The 301st never moved, hence the 97th moved to Biggs Air Force Base, Texas, on 22 May 1948, only two short months later. Meanwhile, the Eighth Air Force assumed control of the wing on 16 May 1948. Eighth Air Force discontinued the 97th Bombardment Wing, Very Heavy, on 12 July 1948 and subsequently redesignated it the 97th Bombardment Wing, Medium, and activated it on the same date. This made the 97th a permanent combat wing. The combat wing service test was over, leaving the 97th with a combat group, an air base group, a maintenance and supply group, and a medical group. The wing was redesignated 97 Bombardment Wing, Heavy, on 1 Oct 1959

=== Biggs AFB, Texas ===
The 97th Bombardment Wing, under SAC, took over operation of Biggs from the departing 47th Bombardment Wing, a Tactical Air Command unit. Biggs would remain the wing's home for over ten years. As the 1940s ended, changes were on the horizon for the 97th's flying mission.

Early in 1950 the 97th received its first Boeing B-50 Superfortress, an improved version of the B-29 capable of delivering atomic weapons. As crews trained and became qualified in the B-50, the wing transferred some of its B-29s to other units. Aerial refueling increased the new bomber's range and brought a new flying mission to the wing.

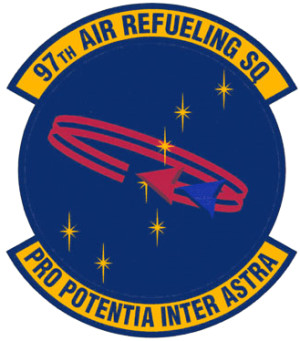
Emblem of the 97th Air Refueling Squadron

The 97th Air Refueling Squadron, activated in March 1949, saw its manning increase as it received its first KB-29P tanker in January 1950. Its mission, as stated in the wing's history, was: "to extend the range of the strategic bombers." The 97th was the first unit to operate the new boom-type or "American-type" equipment. As such it had the burden of testing the equipment and standardizing the operating procedures. The unit received Boeing KC-97 Stratofreighters in 1954 to replace its KB-29s.

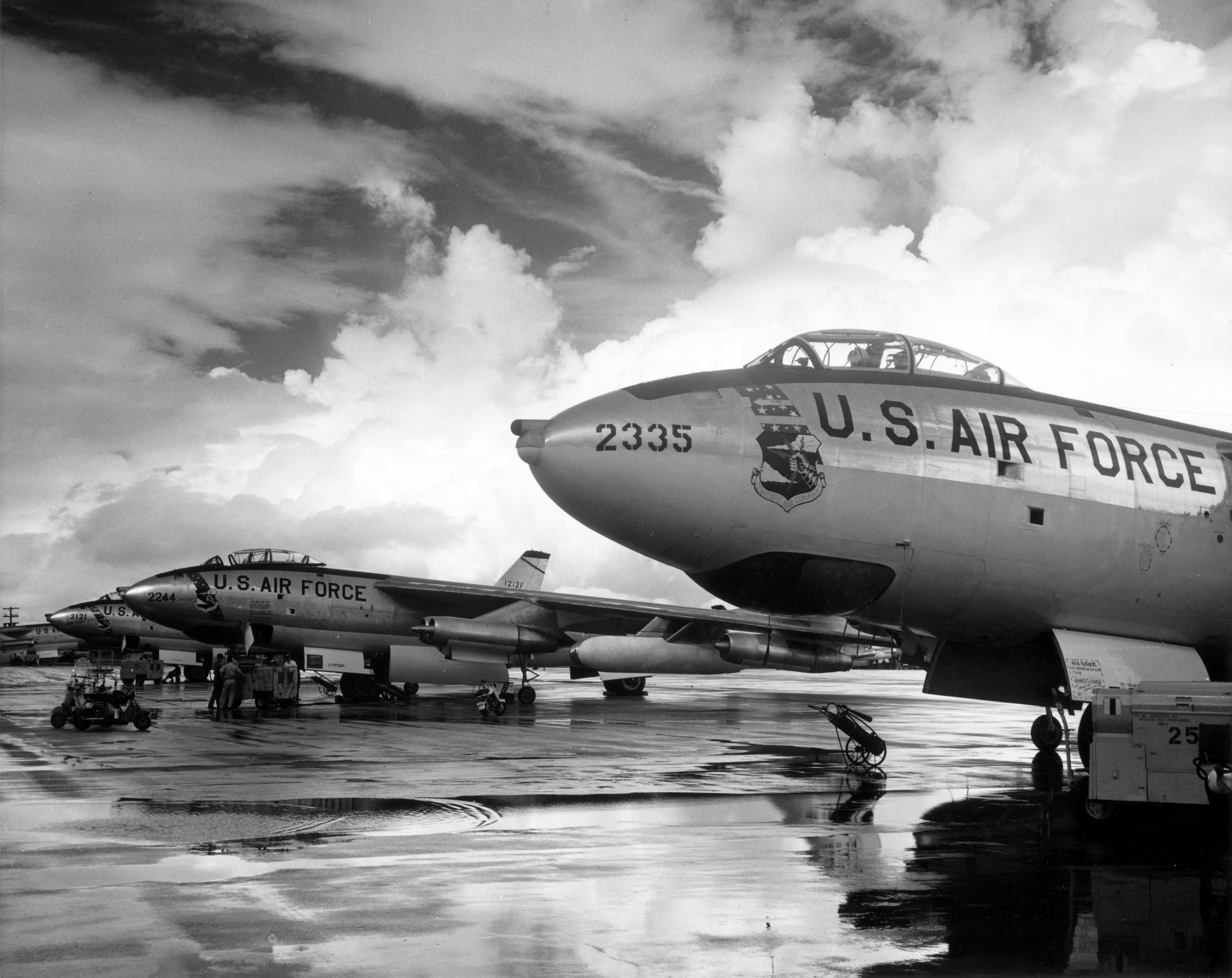
SAC B-47s on the flight line

The 97th Bombardment Wing experienced two mission changes in 1955. First, the 340th Bombardment Squadron, a subordinate unit, started flying RB-50Gs on electronic reconnaissance missions. The 340th went to RAF Upper Heyford, England and Japan on intelligence gathering missions and operated in this capacity for over a year.

Meanwhile, the other bombardment squadrons in the 97th started replacing the propeller-driven B-50s with new Boeing B-47E Stratojet swept-wing medium bombers, capable of flying at high subsonic speeds and primarily designed for penetrating the airspace of the Soviet Union in 1954. The last B-50 assigned to the strategic bomber forces left the 97th wing on 20 October 1955.

The bomb wing conducted training missions and participated in various SAC exercises and deployments with the Stratojet and aerial refueling until December 1958 when SAC rendered it inoperable. Some of the 97th's crews went to other B-47 units, while others began training for duty in the Air Force's latest bomber, the Boeing B-52 Stratofortress.

=== Re-assigned to Arkansas ===
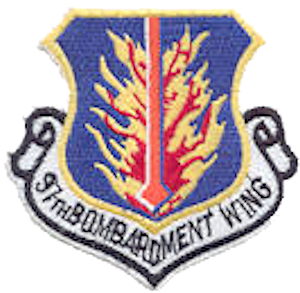
97th Bomb Wing emblem, ca. 1980

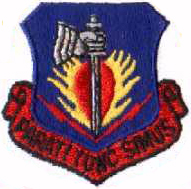
340th Bomb Squadron emblem

The 97th Bombardment Wing moved to Blytheville Air Force Base, (later named Eaker Air Force Base), in northeast Arkansas, after SAC reassigned the wing to the 4th Air Division on 1 July 1959. Later that year SAC redesignated it the 97th Bombardment Wing, Heavy; its new mission was "to provide command and staff supervision over assigned combat tactical units that execute bombardment missions designed to destroy enemy forces and facilities."

The wing's first B-52G, City of Blytheville, Arkansas, arrived in January 1960. That summer, SAC declared the 97th combat-ready and slightly changed the scope of the mission statement. Now operational, the 97th "was to conduct strategic bombardment operations on a global scale, either independently or in cooperation with land and sea forces." The wing's bomber crews, who were assigned to the 340th Bomb Squadron, would fly their share of Operation Chrome Dome missions, which kept a number of SAC's B-52s on airborne alert.

In the early 1960s the 97th received missiles that would improve its B-52's survivability during penetration into enemy territory. On 27 September 1960 the 97th deployed its first GAM-77/AGM-28 Hound Dog, capable of delivering a nuclear warhead 500 nautical miles (930 km) from its launch point, to defeat heavy air defenses. Four months later, on 31 January 1961, the GAM-77/ADM-20 Quail entered the 97th's arsenal. The Quail was a decoy that could generate radar and heat signatures resembling those of a B-52, thereby saturating the enemy's defenses.

The aerial-refueling capability of the KC-135 Stratotankers extended the range of the wing's B-52s. On 12 January 1962, the 97th received its first KC-135, christened the Arkansas Traveler before its first mission three days later. Along with refueling the B-52s on training missions, the tankers participated in an ongoing command-wide rotation to bases in Southern Europe to support Operation Chrome Dome bombers.

=== Cuban Missile Crisis ===
The political climate grew tense in October 1962 as Cuba began preparing sites for offensive Soviet missiles.

On 22 October SAC responded by establishing Defense Condition Three (DEFCON III), and ordered the 97th to place two B-52s on airborne alert. Tension grew and the next day SAC declared DEFCON II, a heightened state of alarm. While at DEFCON II the 97th maintained two B-52s on airborne alert. These, along with bombers from other SAC wings, were ready to strike targets within the Soviet Union. No missions were aborted or canceled during the crisis. The 97th and other units deployed more tankers to Spain to refuel the alert forces.

Reconnaissance photographs taken on 1 November 1962 indicated that the Cubans had begun dismantling the sites. The wing returned to DEFCON III on 15 November and subsequently resumed normal activity on 20 November.

=== Vietnam War ===
The 97th Bomb Wing's involvement in the Vietnam War started slowly, but would demand the wing's undivided attention before ending.

Its involvement began on 14 December 1965 when the wing sent one KC-135 to participate in the Young Tiger Task Force, the operation to refuel fighters involved in the war.

At first, the wing's B-52s remained at Blytheville AFB while bomber crews went to Guam to fly Operation Arc Light bombing missions. However, by the summer of 1972 all the 97th's bombers were at Guam. From there wing crews flew Operation Linebacker II (sometimes called the "11-Day War" because of its intensity) missions in December 1972. On 18 December 1972 Hanoi's air defenses claimed the lives of nine crew members during this operation, while North Vietnamese ground forces captured another four and held them as prisoners of war.

On 15 August 1973, after months of committing most of the wing's people and resources to the war, crew E-21 had the distinction of flying the last mission over a target in Cambodia. This marked the end of the United States' bombing in Southeast Asia.

Active for over 60 years, the 97th Bombardment Wing was a component organization of Strategic Air Command's deterrent force during the Cold War, as a strategic bombardment wing.

=== Resumption of Global Mission ===
The 97th resumed its bomber training and refueling missions after the Vietnam War ended while it continued to participate in contingency operations and assume new roles.

Tanker crews and aircraft refueled other Air Force units supporting the rescue of American citizens in Grenada in October and November 1983. In 1984 the wing upgraded its B-52G force to carry the AGM-86 ALCM air-launched cruise missile. The wing further expanded its mission in 1987 to include conventional bombing, sea search and surveillance, and aerial mining.

=== Desert Storm ===
After Iraq's August 1990 invasion of neighboring Kuwait, the 97th began deploying elements to various locations in the United States and overseas to support Operation Desert Shield. In late December, 97th Bombardment Wing B-52 crews practiced high-altitude bombing missions at the Nellis Test Range in Nevada, anticipating their role in the inevitable war to come.

Once Operation Desert Storm was underway (January 1991) the nature of the wing's involvement changed. At the end of January 1991 six of the wing's bombers and crews assumed ground alert duty at Wurtsmith Air Force Base, Michigan, allowing the 379th Bombardment Wing, stationed at Wurtsmith, to participate in Operation Desert Storm.

On 1 February 1991 major elements of the 97th deployed to RAF Fairford, United Kingdom, forming the 806th Bombardment Wing (Provisional). The wing conducted more than 60 conventional bombing sorties and many air-refueling sorties.

=== The 97th: Re-Invented ===
As the Air Force began reorganizing in 1991, it redesignated the wing as the 97th Wing on 1 September to indicate it was composed of both bomber and tanker aircraft, and inactivated it on 1 April 1992 as Eaker Air Force Base closed.

On 1 October 1992 the Air Force activated the wing at Altus Air Force Base, Oklahoma, and redesignated it the 97th Air Mobility Wing under Air Mobility Command. At the same time the Air Force inactivated the 443d Military Airlift Wing, which had been the host wing at Altus since 5 May 1969. Less than a year later, on 1 July 1993, Air Education and Training Command assumed control of the 97th.

The redesignated wing possessed Lockheed C-5 Galaxies, Lockheed C-141 Starlifters, and Boeing KC-135 Stratotankers; it subsequently started to add McDonnell Douglas C-17 Globemaster IIIs in March 1996.

The 97th's new mission was: to conduct strategic airlift, aerial delivery, aerial-refueling training schools, conduct training for AMC aircrews, ...provide strategic aircraft support for Joint Chiefs of Staff Single Integrated Operational Plan and conventional contingencies, provide aerial port of embarkation for US Army, Fort Sill, Oklahoma, and accomplish other tasks when assigned by higher authority.

The 97th Air Mobility Wing no longer possesses the C-5 Galaxy aircraft which were transferred in 2007 when the Air Force Reserve Command's 433d Airlift Wing at Lackland AFB/Kelly Field Annex assumed responsibility for all C-5 Formal Unit Training for the Regular Air Force, Air Force Reserve and Air National Guard. The last C-5 Galaxy (tail number 0462) "flyaway" from Altus AFB took place on 20 July 2007, when this aircraft was transferred to the 167th Airlift Wing of the West Virginia Air National Guard at Shepherd Field Air National Guard Base in Martinsburg, West Virginia.

On 23 April 2014, Secretary of the Air Force Deborah Lee James announced Altus Air Force Base as the preferred training unit for the Boeing KC-46 Pegasus aerial refueling aircraft. The 97th Air Mobility Wing took delivery of their first KC-46 on 3 February 2019.

== Lineage ==
- Established as the 97th Bombardment Wing, Very Heavy on 11 September 1947

Organized on 1 December 1947
Redesignated: 97th Bombardment Wing, Medium on 12 July 1948
Redesignated: 97th Bombardment Wing, Heavy on 1 October 1959
Redesignated: 97th Wing on 1 September 1991
Inactivated on 1 April 1992

- Redesignated 97th Air Mobility Wing on 21 August 1992

Activated on 1 October 1992

=== Assignments ===
- Fifteenth Air Force, 1 December 1947

Attached to: Yukon Sector, Alaskan Air Command, 1 December 1947 –
12 March 1948
Attached to: 301st Bombardment Wing, 17 March − 16 May 1948

- Eighth Air Force, 16 May 1948

Attached to: 7th Air Division, 15 March – 11 June 1952

- 810th Air Division, 16 June 1952

Attached to 7 Air Division, 5 May – 4 July 1956

- 4th Air Division, 1 July 1959
- 42d Air Division, 1 July 1963
- 19th Air Division, 2 July 1969
- 42d Air Division, 1 January 1970
- 19th Air Division, 30 June 1971
- 42d Air Division, 1 July 1973
- Eighth Air Force, 16 June 1988 – 1 April 1992
- Twenty-Second Air Force, 1 October 1992
- Nineteenth Air Force, since 1 July 1993

=== Components ===
Groups

- 97th Airdrome Group (later 97th Air Base Group, 97th Combat Support Group, 97th Support Group, 97th Mission Support Group): 1 December 1947 – 16 June 1952; 1 January 1959 – 1 April 1992; 1 October 1992 – present
- 97th Bombardment Group (later 97th Operations Group): 1 December 1947 – 16 June 1952 (detached 4 November 1948 – 15 February 1949, and, c. 27 July 1950 – 9 February 1951); 1 September 1991 – 1 April 1992; 1 October 1992 – present
- 97th Maintenance & Supply Group (later 97th Logistics Group): 1 December 1947 – 15 June 1952; 1 September 1991 – 1 April 1992; 1 October 1992 – c. 1 October 2002
- 97th Station Medical Group (later 97th Medical Group, 97th Medical Squadron, 97th Medical Group, 97th Tactical Hospital): 1 December 1947 – 1 January 1959
- 398th Operations Group: 1 October 1992 – 31 March 1995
- 401st Bombardment Group: attached 10 February-25 June 1951
- 851st Medical Group (later USAF Hospital, Blytheville; 97th Strategic Hospital; 97th Medical Group; 97th Medical Squadron; 97th Medical Group): 1 January 1959 – 1 April 1992, 1 October 1992 – present

Squadrons

- 97th Air Refueling Squadron: attached 12 July 1950 – 15 June 1952, assigned 16 June 1952 – 1 September 1957 (detached c. 21 November-c. 20 December 1954, c. 31 May- 10 July 1955, 1 May-9 July 1957, and 25 August-1 September 1957); assigned 23 October 1964 – 1 September 1991
- 340th Bombardment Squadron: attached 10 February 1951 – 15 June 1952, assigned 16 June 1952 – 1 September 1991 (detached 16 December 1953-c.15 March 1954 and 24 September- 2 November 1957)
- 341st Bombardment Squadron: attached 10 February 1951 – 15 June 1952, assigned 16 June 1952 – 15 February 1960 (detached c. 15 March-c. 12 July 1954 and 12 August-24 September 1957)
- 342d Bombardment Squadron: attached 10 February 1951 – 15 June 1952, assigned 16 June 1952 – 1 May 1960 (detached 10 December 1952 – 19 March 1953 and 1 July-12 August 1957)
- 914th Air Refueling Squadron: 1 October 1961 – 23 October 1964
- 4024th Bombardment Squadron: attached 1 April 1955 – 1 May 1956.

=== Stations ===
- Mile 26 Field, Alaska (later Eielson Air Force Base), 1 December 1947 – 12 March 1948
- Smoky Hill Air Force Base, Kansas, 16 March 1948
- Biggs Air Force Base, Texas, 22 May 1948
- Blytheville Air Force Base (later Eaker Air Force Base), Arkansas, 1 July 1959 – 1 April 1992
- Altus Air Force Base, Oklahoma, 1 October 1992 – present

=== Aircraft ===
- B-17 Flying Fortress 1943–1945
- B-29 Superfortress, 1947–1950
- KB-29 Superfortress (tanker), 1950–1956
- B-50 Superfortress, 1950–1955
- ERB-29 Superfortress, 1954–1956
- RB-50 Superfortress, 1954–1956
- KC-97 Stratofreighter, 1954–1957
- B-47 Stratojet, 1955–1959
- B-52 Stratofortress, 1960–1972, 1973–1991
- KC-135 Stratotanker, 1962–1972, 1973–1992, 1992–1993, 1994–present
- C-141 Starlifter, 1992–2001
- C-5 Galaxy, 1992–2007
- C-17 Globemaster III, 1996–present
- KC-46 Pegasus, 2019–present

=== Awards ===
- Strategic Air Command's Bombing Award: 1951
- Strategic Air Command's Fairchild Trophy: 1951

== See also ==
- David R. Kingsley, World War II Medal of Honor recipient
- List of B-50 units of the United States Air Force
- List of B-47 units of the United States Air Force
- List of B-52 Units of the United States Air Force
