= Carlton D. Everhart II =

United States Air Force general

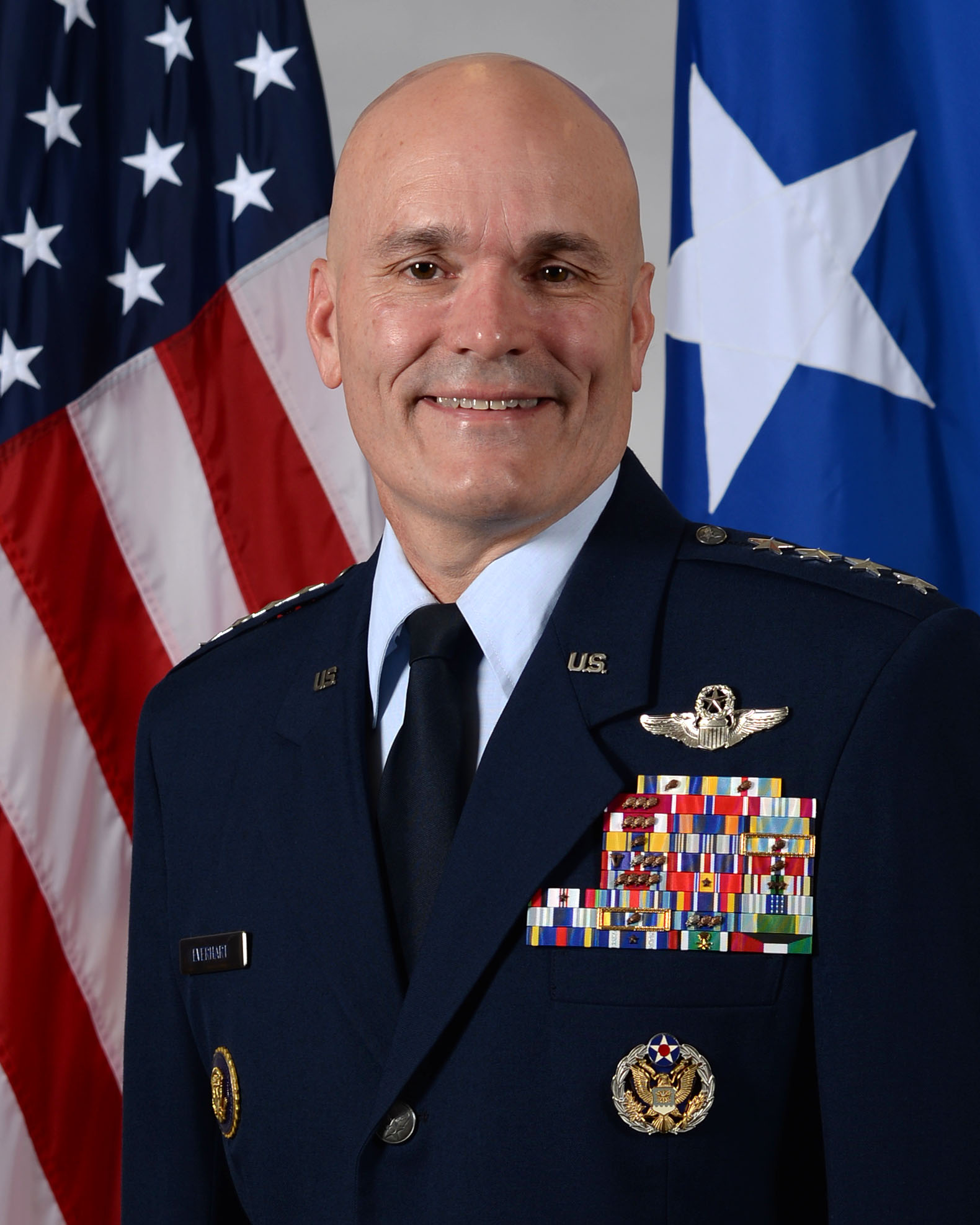
- Everhart as Commander, Air Mobility Command
- Born: June 17, 1961 (age 65); Selfridge Air Force Base, Michigan, U.S.
- Military career
- Allegiance: United States
- Branch: United States Air Force
- Service years: 1983–2018
- Rank: General
- Commands: Air Mobility Command; Eighteenth Air Force; Third Air Force; 618th Air and Space Operations Center (Tanker Airlift Control Center); 97th Air Mobility Wing; 374th Operations Group; 457th Airlift Squadron
- Conflicts: Gulf War; War in Afghanistan
- Awards: Air Force Distinguished Service Medal (2); Defense Superior Service Medal (2); Legion of Merit (4); Bronze Star Medal

Carlton Dewey Everhart II (born June 17, 1961) is a retired United States Air Force general, who served as the commander of Air Mobility Command. He was previously Commander, Third Air Force and commanded Eighteenth Air Force. Everhart is a 1983 graduate of Virginia Tech and received his commission through Air Force ROTC. He is a command pilot with more than 4,500 flight hours. Everhart has served in varying aircrew assignments in the C-130E, C-17A and C-21A. Everhart retired effective November 1, 2018 after more than 35 years of active duty service.

== Military career ==
Everhart's first assignment in February 1984 was as a student at Undergraduate Pilot Training at Columbus Air Force Base. Upon successful completion of pilot training, Everhart next reported to Little Rock Air Force Base to serve in the 50th Tactical Airlift Squadron. From 1985 to 1989, Everhart variously served as a pilot, instructor, aircraft commander, and as a special operations low level aircraft commander. In December 1989, Everhart joined the cadre of the 34th Combat Aircrew Training Squadron, also located at Little Rock AFB. He served as an instructor/evaluator and was the Chief, Joint Airlift Tactics. In November 1992, Everhart was selected for transition to the then new C-17 Globemaster III as a member of the initial training cadre with the 17th Airlift Squadron at Charleston Air Force Base. He later became Deputy and then Chief, Standardization and Evaluation for the 14th Airlift Squadron, also at Charleston AFB.

Starting in June 1996, Everhart began a series of assignments in the National Capital Region. He first served as a Mobility Force Planner in the Directorates of Forces and Requirements, Headquarters U.S. Air Force, followed by a stint as the Executive Officer, Directorate of Joint Matters, Headquarters U.S. Air Force. From March 1998 to March 2000, Everhart served as an Air Force Aide to the President. Everhart's first command came in June 2000, when he assumed command of the 457th Airlift Squadron at Andrews Air Force Base. His time in the National Capital Region concluded when he completed a master's degree at the National War College at Fort Lesley J. McNair in 2002.

In 2002, Everhart served for a year as the Chief, Joint Mobility Operations Center Team at U.S. Transportation Command, Scott Air Force Base. This assignment was followed by Group command of the 374th Operations Group from August 2003 to July 2005 at Yokota Air Base, Japan. During that assignment, Everhart deployed to Southwest Asia and was the Commander, 386th Expeditionary Wing from March to July 2004.

Returning to the United States in July 2005, Everhart became the Vice Commander, 97th Air Mobility Wing at Altus Air Force Base. He assumed command of the wing in September, serving as the commander until August 2007.

In August 2007, Everhart began his first assignment with Air Education and Training Command (AETC) as the Inspector General, Headquarters Air Education and Training Command at Randolph Air Force Base. In June 2008, he became the Deputy Director of Intelligence, Operations and Nuclear Integration for Flying Training at HQ AETC.

=== General officer assignments ===
Everhart's first assignment after being promoted to flag rank was as Deputy Commander, Political-Military Affairs, Combined Security Transition Command-Afghanistan in Kabul, Afghanistan, from March 2009 to April 2010. Returning to Scott Air Force Base in June 2010, Everhart was Vice Commander, 618th Air and Space Operations Center (Tanker Airlift Control Center). He became the 618th's commander in July 2011, serving in that capacity until April 2012.

Everhart became the Vice Commander, 3rd Air Force (3AF)at Ramstein Air Base, Germany in April 2012. He was dual hatted as the Commander, U.S. Air Forces Africa from May 2012 to July 2012. While serving as Vice Commander, 3AF, the commander Craig A. Franklin became embroiled in a scandal concerning his overturning of the conviction of an Air Force officer for sexual assault. Franklin retired early, at a reduced rank, so that his command and the Air Force could be spared further scrutiny for his actions. He relinquished command on 31 January 2014. This left Everhart to become Commander, 3rd Air Force on 1 February 2014, serving until June 2014.

On 11 August 2015, General Everhart assumed command of Air Mobility Command at Scott Air Force Base, Illinois. He retired from the Air Force on November 1, 2018.

== Education ==
Everhart was commissioned through Air Force ROTC upon his completion of a Bachelor of Science degree in Agriculture at Virginia Tech. He earned a Master of Science degree in business management from the University of Arkansas in 1989. Everhart earned a Master of Science degree in National Security Strategy from the National War College in 2002. Everhart has attended both the Capstone and Pinnacle Courses at the National Defense University.

Everhart is a graduate of numerous Professional Military Education programs. He has graduated from the following: Squadron Officer School in 1989, Air Command and Staff College in 1995, Army Command and General Staff College in 1996, and Air War College in 2001.

== Awards and decorations ==
Everhart has been awarded the following awards and decorations:

| 1st Row | US Air Force Command Pilot Badge | | |
| 2nd Row | Air Force Distinguished Service Medal with one bronze oak leaf cluster | | Defense Superior Service Medal with oak leaf cluster |
| 3rd Row | Legion of Merit with three bronze oak leaf clusters | Bronze Star Medal | Defense Meritorious Service Medal |
| 4th Row | Meritorious Service Medal with three bronze oak leaf clusters | Air Medal | Aerial Achievement Medal |
| 5th Row | Air Force Commendation Medal with one bronze oak leaf cluster | Air Force Achievement Medal | Joint Meritorious Unit Award with one bronze oak leaf cluster |
| 6th Row | Air Force Outstanding Unit Award with "V" Device, one silver and two bronze oak leaf clusters | Air Force Outstanding Unit Award (second ribbon to denote ninth award due to accoutrement spacing) | Air Force Organizational Excellence Award with oak leaf cluster |
| 7th Row | Combat Readiness Medal with four bronze oak leaf clusters | National Defense Service Medal with one bronze service star | Southwest Asia Service Medal with two bronze service stars |
| 8th Row | Afghanistan Campaign Medal with one bronze service star | Global War on Terrorism Expeditionary Medal | Global War on Terrorism Service Medal |
| 9th Row | Air Force Overseas Short Tour Service Ribbon | Air Force Overseas Long Tour Service Ribbon | Air Force Expeditionary Service Ribbon with gold frame and one bronze oak leaf cluster |
| 10th Row | Air Force Longevity Service Award with one silver and two bronze oak leaf clusters | Small Arms Expert Marksmanship Ribbon | Air Force Training Ribbon |
| 11th Row | NATO Medal for service with ISAF and one bronze service star | Kuwait Liberation Medal (Saudi Arabia) | Kuwait Liberation Medal (Kuwait) |
| 12th Row | Headquarters Air Force Badge | | Presidential Service Badge |

== Effective dates of promotion ==
- Second Lieutenant: Oct. 11, 1983
- First Lieutenant: Oct. 11, 1985
- Captain: Oct. 11, 1987
- Major: Nov. 1, 1994
- Lieutenant Colonel: July 1, 1999
- Colonel: Aug. 1, 2003
- Brigadier General: Jan. 31, 2009
- Major General: July 20, 2012
- Lieutenant General: June 20, 2014
- General: Aug. 11, 2015

Military offices
| Preceded by Craig A. Franklin | Commander, Third Air Force; 2014 | Succeeded by Darryl Roberson |
| Preceded by Darren W. McDew | Commander, Eighteenth Air Force; 2014–2015 | Succeeded by Samuel D. Cox |
| Preceded by Darren W. McDew | Commander, Air Mobility Command; 2015–2018 | Succeeded by Maryanne Miller |
