= Director of Staff of the United States Air Force =

Position in the United States Air Force

The Assistant Vice Chief of Staff of the United States Air Force was a position in the United States Air Force held by a lieutenant general who also served as the director of the Air Staff. The holder of the position oversees the administration and organization of the Air Staff, which develops policies, plans and programs; establishes requirements; and provides resources to support the Air Force's mission. He also serves as Deputy Chairman of the Air Force Council, and is the Air Force accreditation official for the international Corps of Air Attachés.

== List of Assistant Vice Chiefs of Staff of the United States Air Force ==
The following officers served as Assistant Vice Chief of Staff of the United States Air Force:

No.	Assistant Vice Chief of Staff		Term		
No.	Portrait	Name	Took office	Left office	Term length
1	William F. McKee	Major General; William F. McKee (1906–1987)	27 Sep 1947	23 Apr 1953	5 years, 208 days
-	Robert Whitney Burns	Major General; Robert Whitney Burns (1908–1964); Acting	24 Apr 1953	10 May 1953	16 days
2	Robert Whitney Burns	Major General; Robert Whitney Burns (1908–1964)	11 May 1953	30 Jun 1955	2 years, 50 days
3	Jacob E. Smart	Major General; Jacob E. Smart (1909–2006)	15 Jun 1955	4 Sep 1959	4 years, 81 days
4	Richard M. Montgomery	Major General; Richard M. Montgomery (1911–1987)	24 Aug 1959	31 Aug 1962	3 years, 7 days
5	John K. Hester	Major General; John K. Hester (1916–1965)	1 Aug 1962	30 Sep 1964	2 years, 60 days
6	William K. Martin	Major General; William K. Martin	1 Oct 1964	18 Feb 1965	140 days
7	Hewitt T. Wheless	Lieutenant General; Hewitt T. Wheless	19 Feb 1965	12 Jul 1968	3 years, 144 days
8	Seth J. McKee	Lieutenant General; Seth J. McKee (1916–2016)	13 Jul 1968	11 Jul 1969	363 days
-	John Wilson Carpenter III	Lieutenant General; John Wilson Carpenter III (1916–1996); Acting	12 Jul 1969	31 Jul 1969	19 days
9	John Wilson Carpenter III	Lieutenant General; John Wilson Carpenter III (1916–1996)	1 Aug 1969	1 Jul 1970	334 days
10	Austin J. Russell	Lieutenant General; Austin J. Russell	1 Aug 1970	30 Sep 1973	3 years, 60 days
11	Duward Crow	Lieutenant General; Duward Crow (1919–1997)	1 Oct 1973	31 Jul 1974	303 days
12	Marion L. Boswell	Lieutenant General; Marion L. Boswell (1923–2002)	1 Aug 1974	14 Oct 1976	2 years, 74 days
13	William G. Moore Jr.	Lieutenant General; William G. Moore Jr. (1920–2012)	1 Oct 1976	3 Mar 1977	153 days
14	Wilbur L. Creech	Lieutenant General; Wilbur L. Creech (1927–2003)	2 May 1977	28 Feb 1978	302 days
15	Howard M. Fish	Lieutenant General; Howard M. Fish (1923–2020)	1 Mar 1978	31 May 1979	1 year, 91 days
16	Marion L. Boswell	Lieutenant General; Marion L. Boswell (1923–2002)	1 Jun 1979	30 Jun 1981	2 years, 29 days
17	Hans H. Driessnack	Lieutenant General; Hans H. Driessnack (1927–2006)	1 Jul 1981	30 Jun 1983	1 year, 364 days
18	Howard W. Leaf	Lieutenant General; Howard W. Leaf (1923–2009)	1 Jul 1983	30 Sep 1984	1 year, 91 days
19	Robert H. Reed	Lieutenant General; Robert H. Reed (1929–2017)	10 Oct 1984	30 Jun 1986	1 year, 263 days
20	Carl R. Smith	Lieutenant General; Carl R. Smith	1 Jul 1986	31 Jan 1991	4 years, 214 days
21	Charles A. May	Lieutenant General; Charles A. May	1 Feb 1991	15 Jul 1992	1 year, 165 days
22	Thomas G. McInerney	Lieutenant General; Thomas G. McInerney (born 1937)	15 Jul 1992	30 Jun 1994	1 year, 350 days
23	James A. Fain	Lieutenant General; James A. Fain	24 Oct 1994	1 May 1995	189 days
24	Lloyd W. Newton	Lieutenant General; Lloyd W. Newton (born 1942)	3 Jun 1995	7 Mar 1997	1 year, 277 days
25	David L. Vesely	Lieutenant General; David L. Vesely	17 Mar 1997	30 Sep 1999	2 years, 197 days
26	William J. Begert	Lieutenant General; William J. Begert (born 1946)	1 Oct 1999	30 Apr 2001	1 year, 211 days
27	Lance W. Lord	Lieutenant General; Lance W. Lord (born 1946)	1 May 2001	31 Mar 2002	334 days
28	Joseph P. Wehrle Jr.	Lieutenant General; Joseph P. Wehrle Jr.	1 Apr 2002	30 Sep 2003	1 year, 182 days
-	Richard E. Brown	Lieutenant General; Richard E. Brown; Acting	1 Jun 2004	30 Jul 2004	59 days
-	Kevin P. Chilton	Lieutenant General; Kevin P. Chilton (born 1954); Acting	1 Aug 2004	30 Jun 2005	333 days
29	Arthur J. Lichte	Lieutenant General; Arthur J. Lichte (born 1949)	1 Jul 2005	Aug 2007	~2 years, 31 days
30	Frank Klotz	Lieutenant General; Frank Klotz (born 1950)	Aug 2007	24 Jul 2009	~1 year, 357 days
31	William L. Shelton	Lieutenant General; William L. Shelton (born 1954)	27 Jul 2009	13 Dec 2010	1 year, 139 days
32	Richard Y. Newton III	Lieutenant General; Richard Y. Newton III	14 Dec 2010	27 Apr 2012	1 year, 135 days
33	Frank Gorenc	Lieutenant General; Frank Gorenc (born 1957)	27 Apr 2012	August 2013	~1 year, 96 days
34	Stephen L. Hoog	Lieutenant General; Stephen L. Hoog	August 2013	July 2015	~1 year, 334 days
35	John W. Hesterman III	Lieutenant General; John W. Hesterman III	July 2015	August 2016	~1 year, 31 days
36	Stayce Harris	Lieutenant General; Stayce Harris (born 1959)	August 2016	November 2017	~1 year, 92 days

== Director of Staff of the Air Force ==
Lt Gen Stayce Harris became the last to hold the office, but the position of Director of Staff remained.

No.	Director of Staff		Term		
No.	Portrait	Name	Took office	Left office	Term length
1	Jacqueline Van Ovost	Lieutenant General; Jacqueline Van Ovost (born 1965)	November 2017	April 2020	~2 years, 152 days
2	Timothy G. Fay	Lieutenant General; Timothy G. Fay	April 2020	July 6, 2021	~1 year, 96 days
3	Kevin B. Schneider	Lieutenant General; Kevin B. Schneider	September 8, 2021	January 30, 2024	2 years, 144 days
4	Scott L. Pleus	Lieutenant General; Scott L. Pleus	January 30, 2024	June 3, 2026	2 years, 124 days
5	Andrew Gebara	Lieutenant General; Andrew Gebara	~June 3, 2026	Incumbent	~2 days
