= Kevin Schneider =

American Air Force general

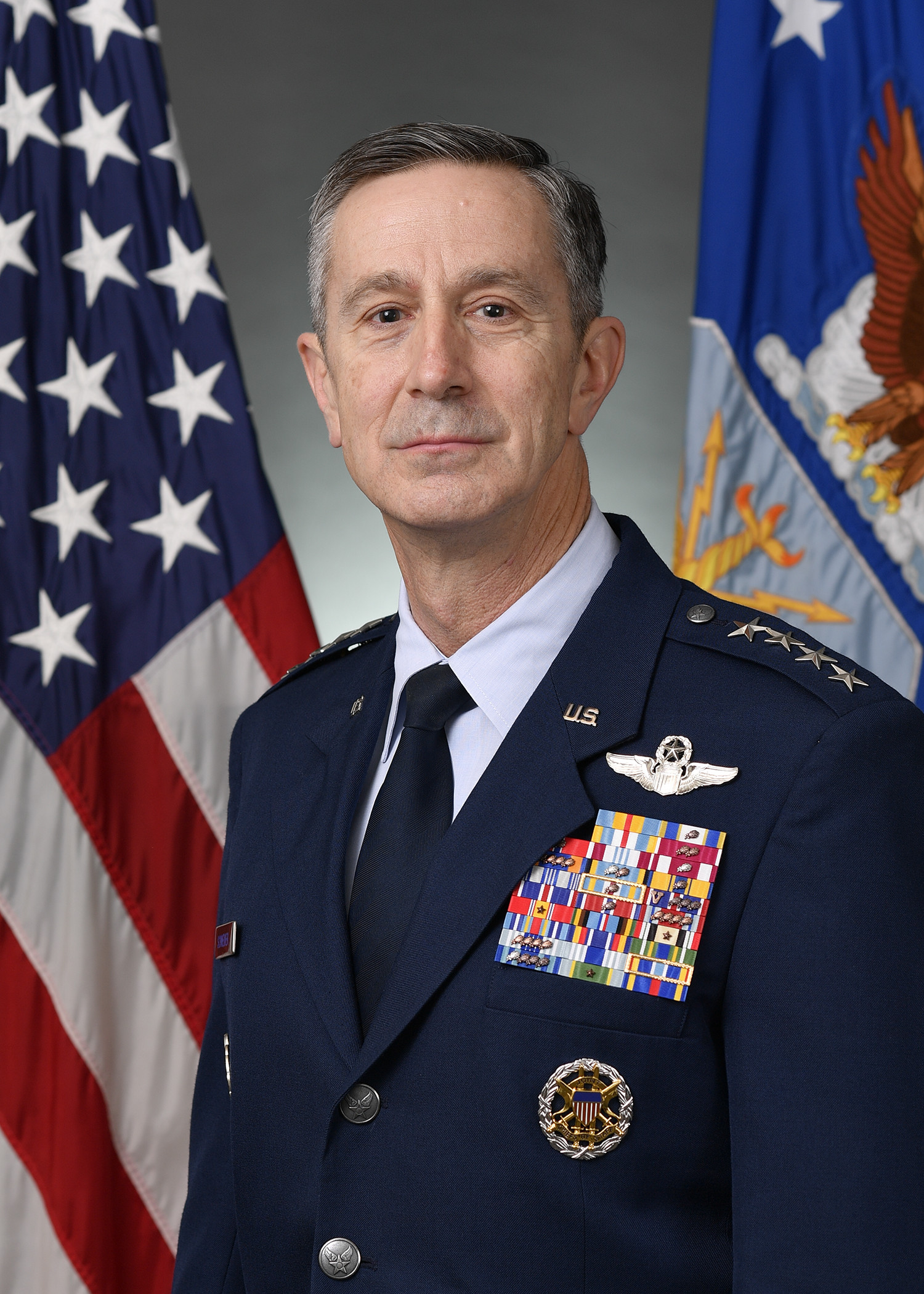
- Official portrait, 2024
- Military career
- Allegiance: United States
- Branch: United States Air Force
- Service years: 1988–present
- Rank: General
- Commands: Pacific Air Forces; United States Forces Japan; Fifth Air Force; 380th Air Expeditionary Wing; 80th Flying Training Wing; 80th Fighter Squadron
- Conflicts: Iraq War
- Awards: Defense Distinguished Service Medal; Air Force Distinguished Service Medal (2); Defense Superior Service Medal; Legion of Merit (3); Bronze Star Medal (2)

Kevin Bruce Schneider is a United States Air Force general who has served as the commander of the Pacific Air Forces since 2024. He previously served as director of staff of the United States Air Force from 2021 to 2024. He also served as the commander of the United States Forces Japan and the Fifth Air Force.

== Air Force career ==
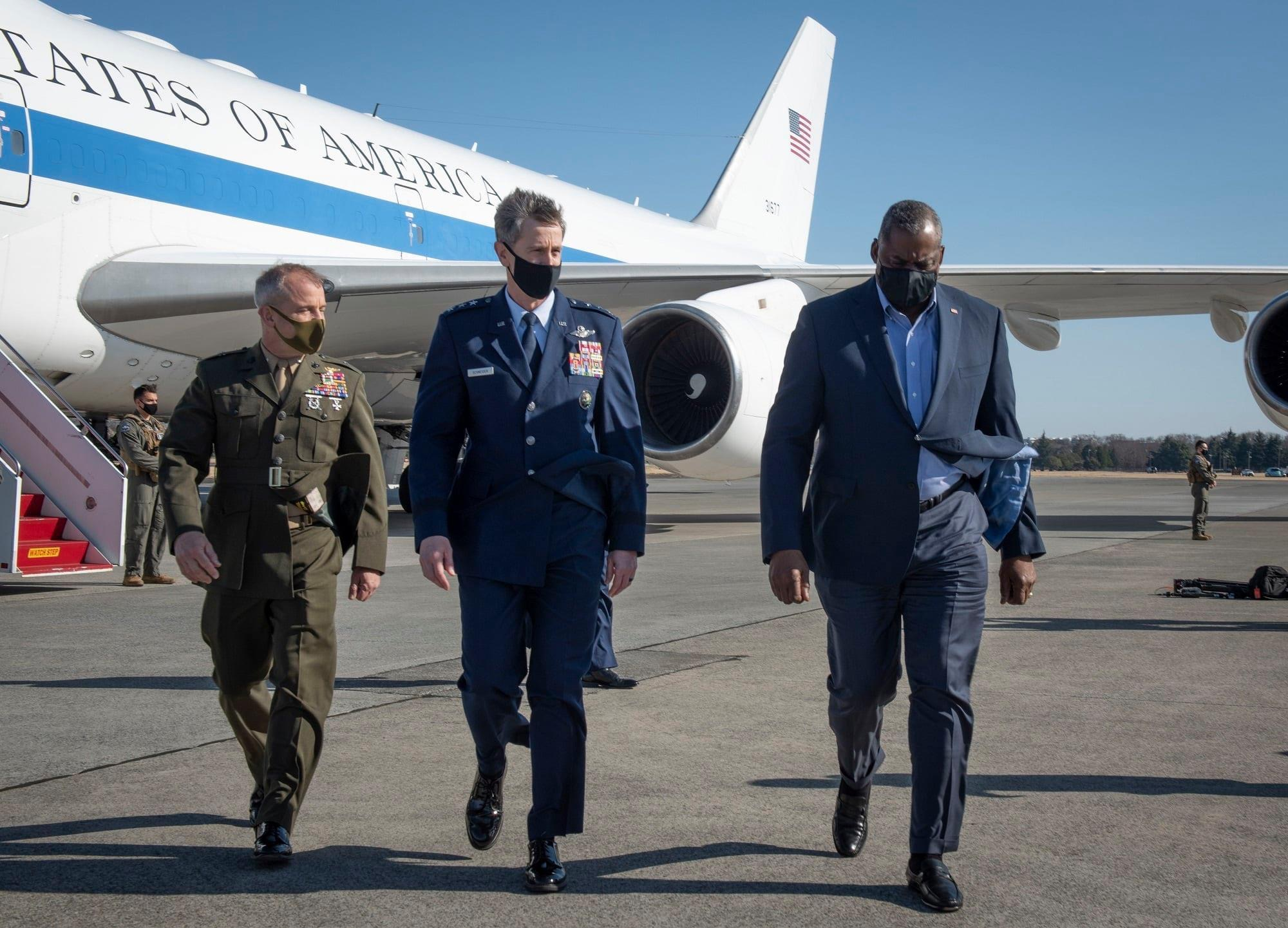
Schneider with United States Secretary of Defense Lloyd Austin at Yokota Air Force Base, 17 March 2021

Kevin Schneider was raised in Springfield, Virginia, and graduated from the United States Air Force Academy in 1988 with a degree in engineering science. He attended Euro-NATO Joint Jet Pilot training at Sheppard Air Force Base in Wichita Falls, Texas, and graduated in 1989. He attended F-16 Fighting Falcon training at MacDill Air Force Base, and was stationed at Osan Air Base and Misawa Air Base. In 1996, he graduated from the USAF Weapons School. He was then stationed at Shaw Air Force Base and as a Weapons School instructor at Nellis Air Force Base. He served as the aide-de-camp for then-Chief of Staff of the Air Force General Michael E. Ryan. He served as chief of the 52nd Fighter Wing Weapons and Tactics at Spangdahlem Air Base, and commanded the 80th Fighter Squadron at Kunsan Air Base. He attended the Marine Corps War College, and served as the deputy commander of the 56th Operations Group and as vice commander of the 388th Fighter Wing. He commanded the 80th Flying Training Wing at Sheppard Air Force Base, and the 380th Air Expeditionary Wing at Al Dhafra Air Base. He then served as the chief of staff of the Pacific Air Forces and Indo-Pacific Command Headquarters in Hawaii. In February 2019, he assumed command of Fifth Air Force and United States Forces Japan.

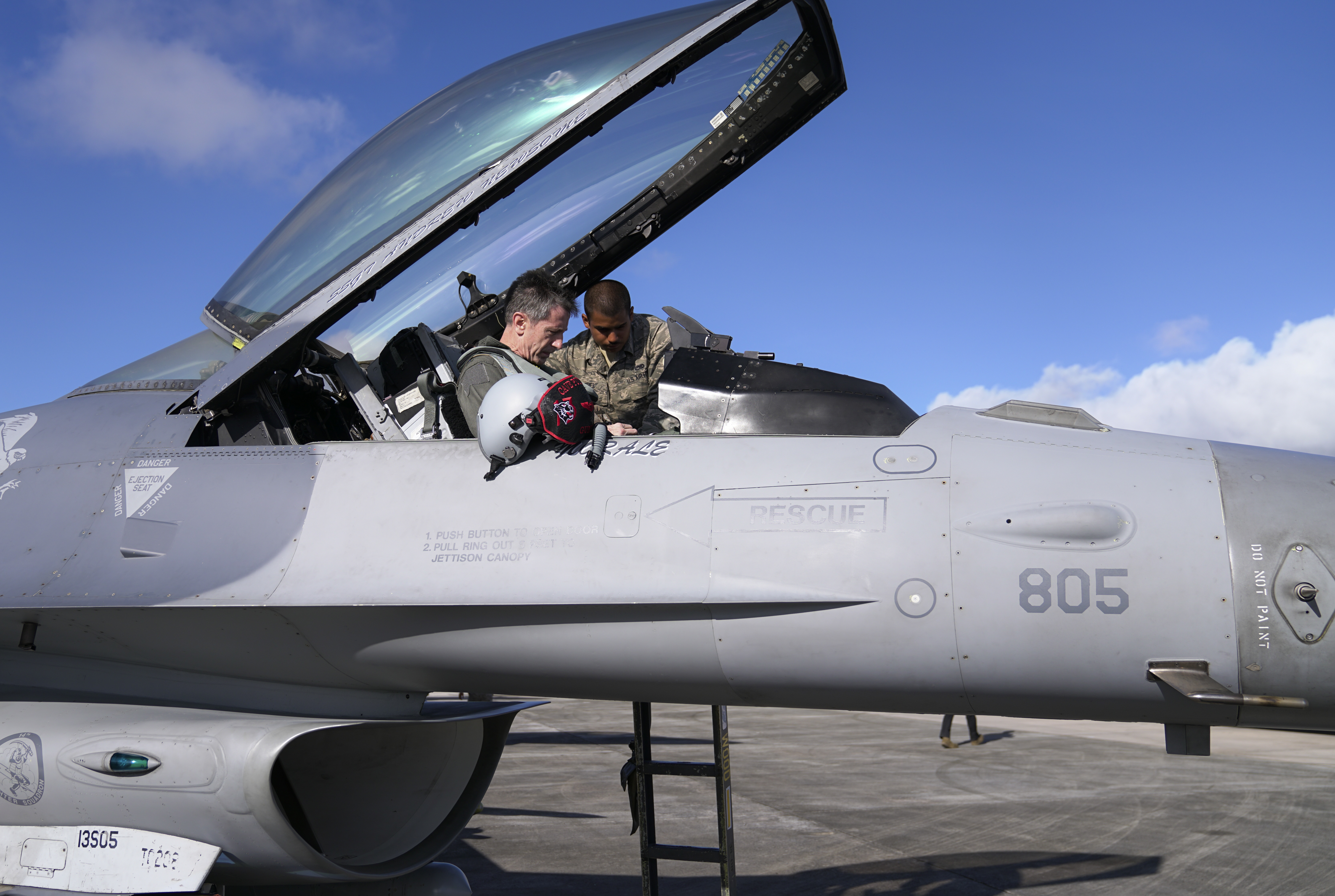
Schneider piloting a Lockheed-Martin F-16 Fighting Falcon

In July 2021, he was nominated and confirmed to succeed Timothy Fay as Director of Staff of the United States Air Force. He assumed the position on 8 September 2021.

In April 2023, Schneider was nominated for promotion to general and assignment as commander of the Pacific Air Forces. He received his promotion to general and assumed command of the Pacific Air Forces on 9 February 2024.

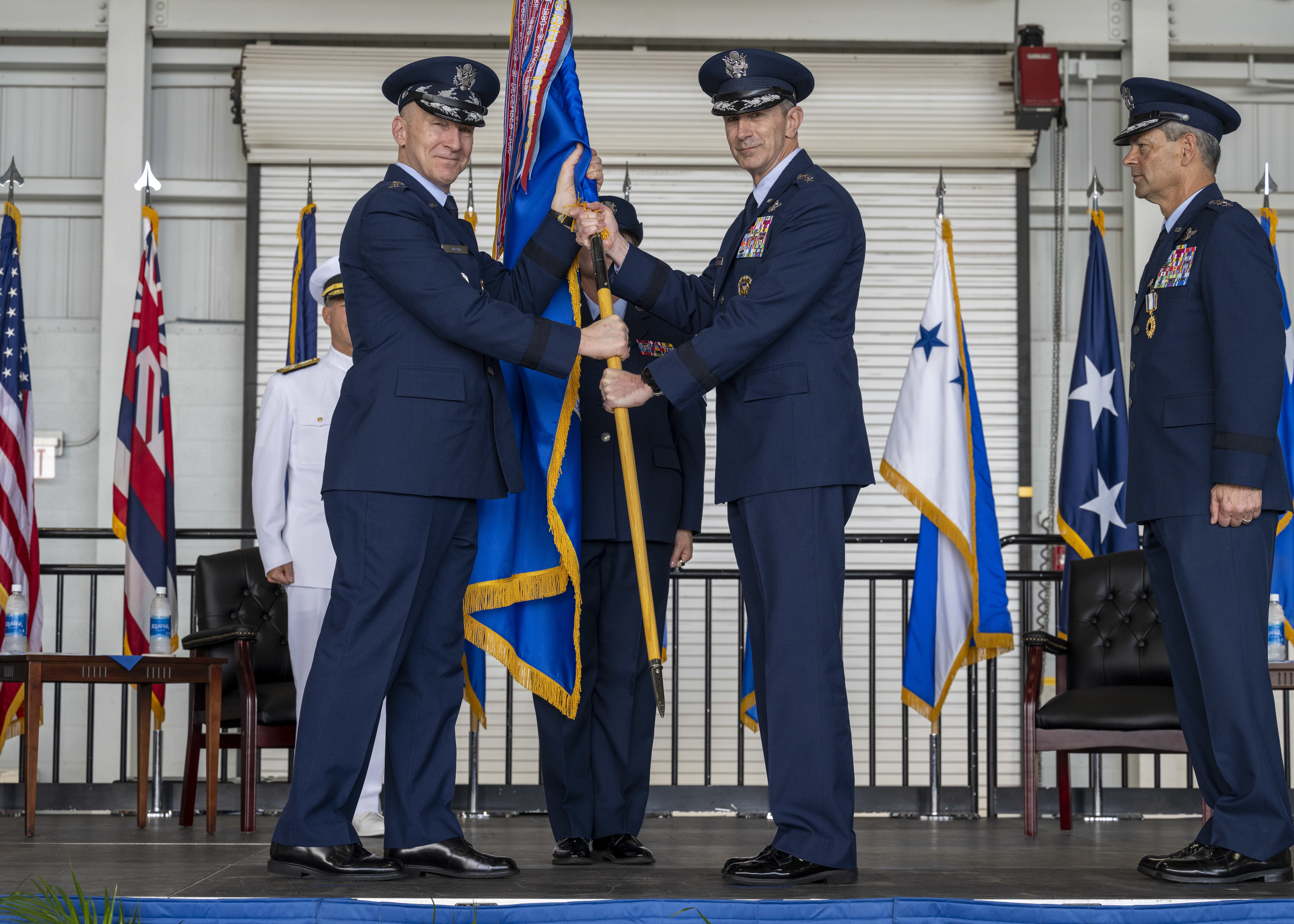
Schneider (center right, holding flag) assumes command of Pacific Air Forces on 9 February 2024

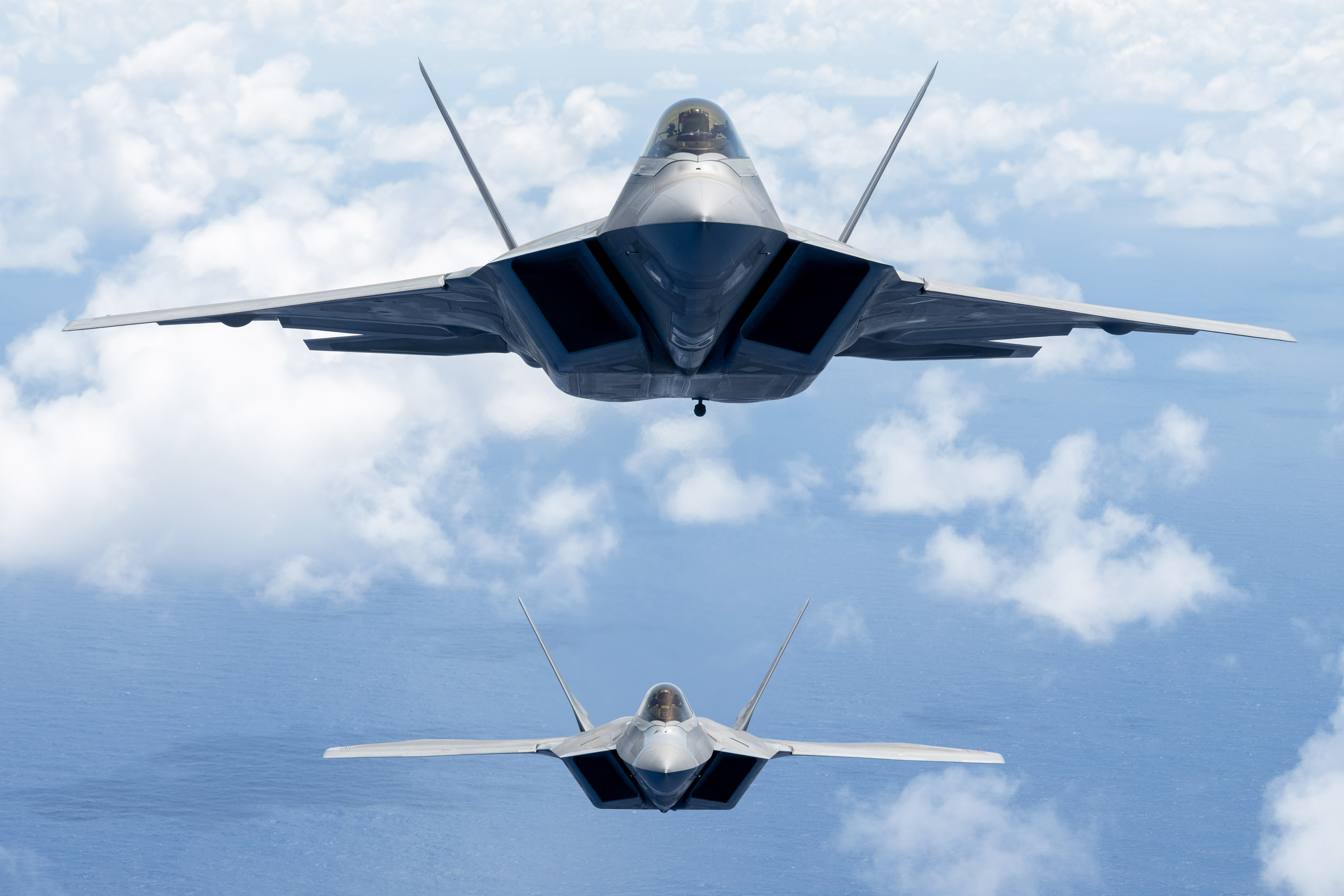
Gen.Kevin B. Schneider, Pacific Air Forces commander, flies an F-22 Raptor during a mission off the coast of Oahu, Hawaii, April 8, 2025.

== Awards and decorations ==
| US Air Force Command Pilot Badge |
| Headquarters Air Force Badge |

| Defense Distinguished Service Medal |
| Air Force Distinguished Service Medal with oak leaf cluster |
| Defense Superior Service Medal |
| Legion of Merit with two oak leaf clusters |
| Bronze Star Medal with oak leaf cluster |
| Defense Meritorious Service Medal |
| Meritorious Service Medal with silver oak leaf cluster |
| Air Medal with four oak leaf clusters |
| Aerial Achievement Medal with one silver and one bronze oak leaf clusters |
| Air Force Commendation Medal with oak leaf cluster |
| Air Force Achievement Medal |
| Joint Meritorious Unit Award with oak leaf cluster |
| Air Force Outstanding Unit Award with "V" device and three oak leaf clusters |
| Air Force Outstanding Unit Award (second ribbon to denote fifth award) |
| Air Force Organizational Excellence Award with oak leaf cluster |
| Combat Readiness Medal with four oak leaf clusters |
| National Defense Service Medal with one bronze service star |
| Armed Forces Expeditionary Medal |
| Iraq Campaign Medal with service star |
| Global War on Terrorism Expeditionary Medal |
| Global War on Terrorism Service Medal |
| Korea Defense Service Medal |
| Air Force Overseas Short Tour Service Ribbon with four oak leaf clusters |
| Air Force Overseas Long Tour Service Ribbon |
| Air Force Expeditionary Service Ribbon |
| Air Force Longevity Service Award with one silver and three bronze oak leaf clusters |
| Small Arms Expert Marksmanship Ribbon with service star |
| Air Force Training Ribbon |
| Order of the Rising Sun, Grand Cordon (Japan) |

== Effective dates of promotions ==
| Insignia | Rank | Date |
|---|---|---|
| | General | 9 February 2024 |
| | Lieutenant general | 5 February 2019 |
| | Major general | 2 November 2015 |
| | Brigadier general | 2 June 2013 |
| | Colonel | 1 September 2007 |
| | Lieutenant colonel | 1 February 2003 |
| | Major | 1 August 1998 |
| | Captain | 1 June 1992 |
| | First lieutenant | 1 June 1990 |
| | Second lieutenant | 1 June 1988 |

Military offices
| Preceded by Paul H. McGillicuddy | Commander of the 380th Air Expeditionary Wing; 2013–2014 | Succeeded by John T. Quintas |
| Preceded by John L. Dolan | Assistant Deputy Commander of the United States Air Forces Central Command; 2014–2015 | Succeeded by ??? |
| Preceded by ??? | Chief of Staff of the Pacific Air Forces; 2015–2016 | Succeeded by Gregory M. Guillot |
| Preceded by Eric P. Wendt as Chief of Staff of the United States Pacific Command | Chief of Staff of the United States Indo-Pacific Command; 2016–2019 | Succeeded by Michael Minihan |
| Preceded by Jerry P. Martinez | Commander of United States Forces Japan and Fifth Air Force; 2019–2021 | Succeeded by Ricky N. Rupp |
| Preceded by Timothy G. Fay | Director of Staff of the United States Air Force; 2021–2024 | Succeeded by Scott L. Pleus |
| Preceded by Kenneth S. Wilsbach | Commander of Pacific Air Forces; 2024–present | Incumbent |
