= Jacqueline Van Ovost =

US Air Force general (born 1965)

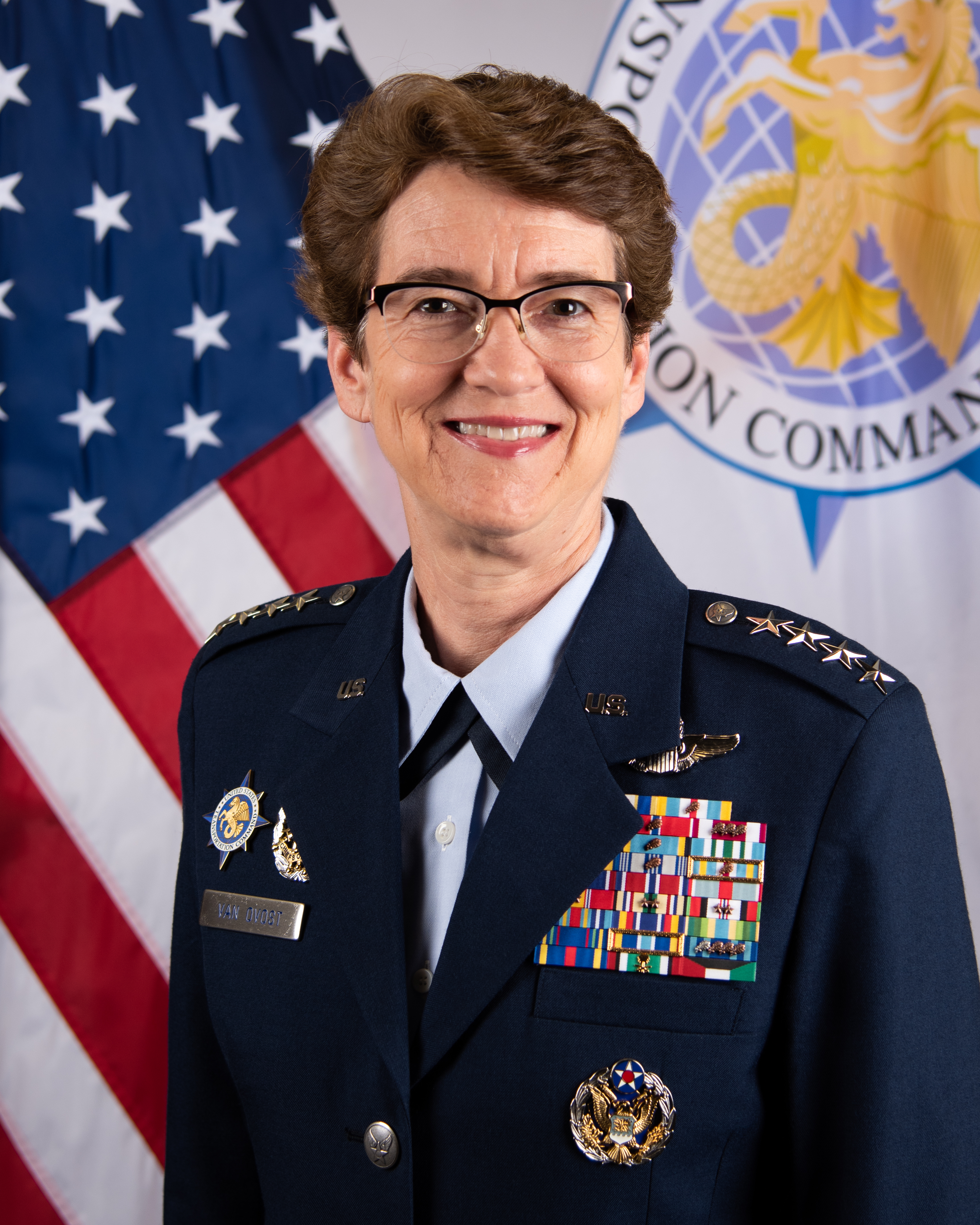
- Born: September 29, 1965 (age 60); Arlington Heights, Illinois, U.S.
- Branch: United States Air Force
- Service years: 1988–2024
- Rank: General
- Commands: United States Transportation Command; Air Mobility Command; 89th Airlift Wing; 12th Flying Training Wing; 384th Air Refueling Squadron
- Conflicts: Gulf War; War in Afghanistan
- Awards: Defense Distinguished Service Medal; Air Force Distinguished Service Medal (2); Defense Superior Service Medal (2); Legion of Merit (2); Bronze Star (2)
- Education: United States Air Force Academy (BS); California State University, Fresno (MS); Air University (MMAS, MS)
- Jacqueline Van Ovost's voice Van Ovost testifies at a House Armed Services joint subcommittee hearing on the state of the mobility enterprise Recorded April 11, 2024

Jacqueline Desiree Van Ovost (born September 29, 1965) is a retired United States Air Force general who last served as the 14th commander of United States Transportation Command from 2021 to 2024. She was nominated to that post by President Biden on March 5, 2021. Van Ovost had previously served as the commander of Air Mobility Command from 2020 to 2021. In early 2021, she was the only active-duty female four-star general officer in the United States.

== Education ==
Van Ovost received a Bachelor of Science degree in Aeronautical Engineering from the United States Air Force Academy in 1988. After commissioning into the US Air Force, she attended Undergraduate Pilot Training (1989) followed by U.S. Air Force Test Pilot School (1994). Van Ovost holds master's degrees from California State University, Fresno in mechanical engineering (1996), from Air Command and Staff College in military arts and sciences (1999), and from Air War College in strategic studies (2004).

== Military career ==
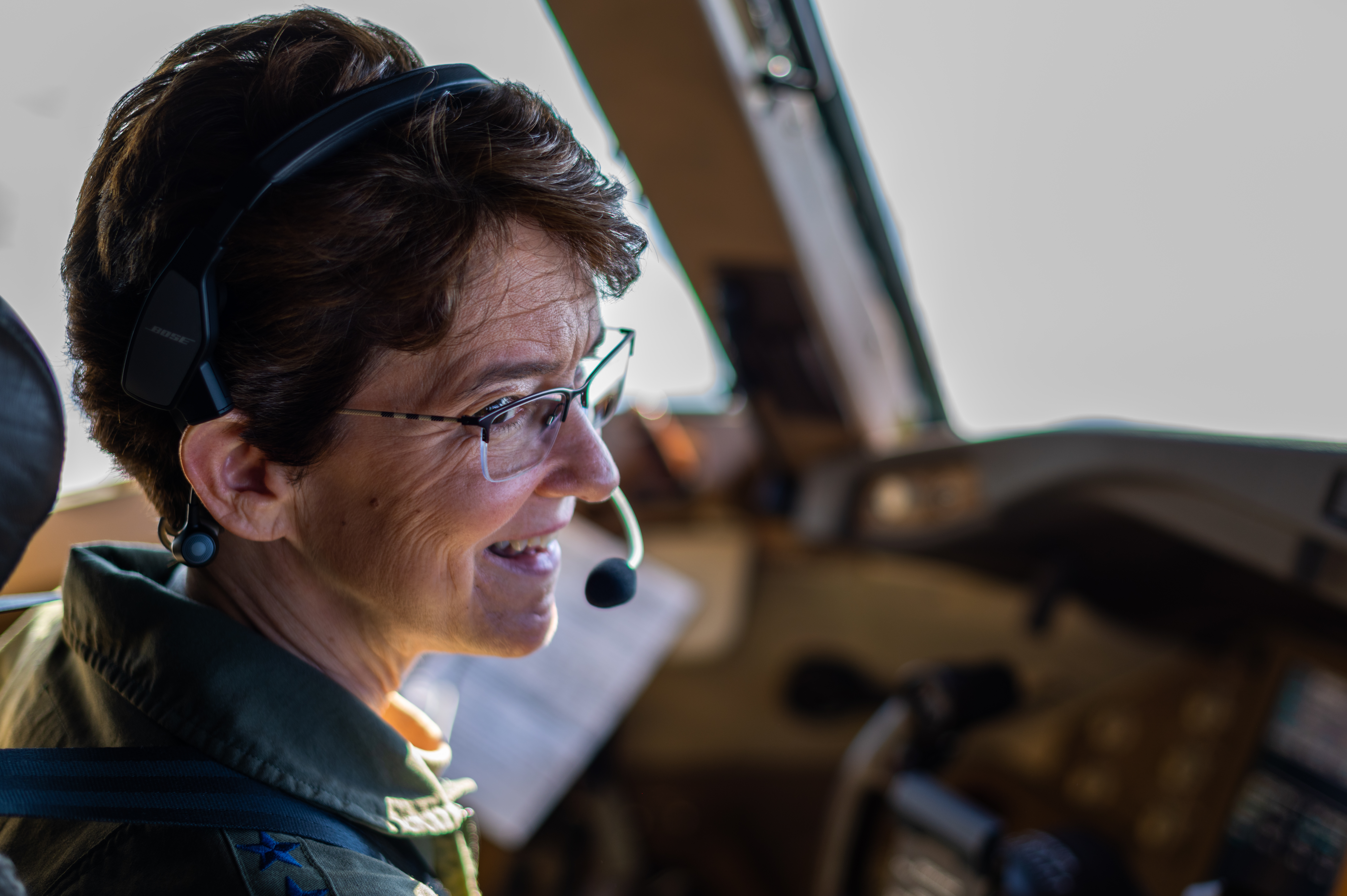
Van Ovost flying a Boeing KC-46A Pegasus, February 6, 2021

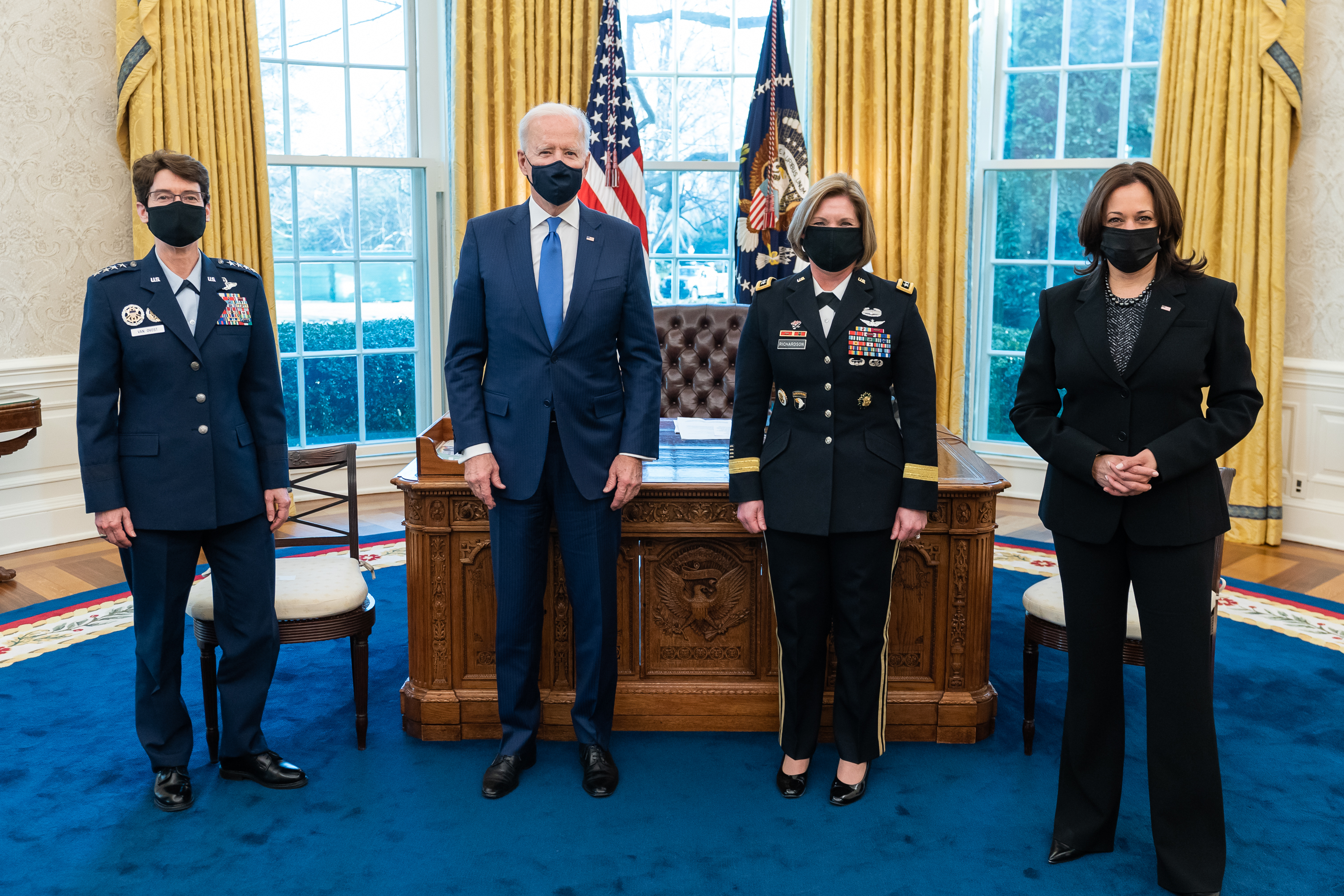
Gen. Jacqueline Van Ovost with President Joe Biden and Vice President Kamala Harris and Lt. Gen. Laura Richardson at the Oval Office, White House, March 10, 2021

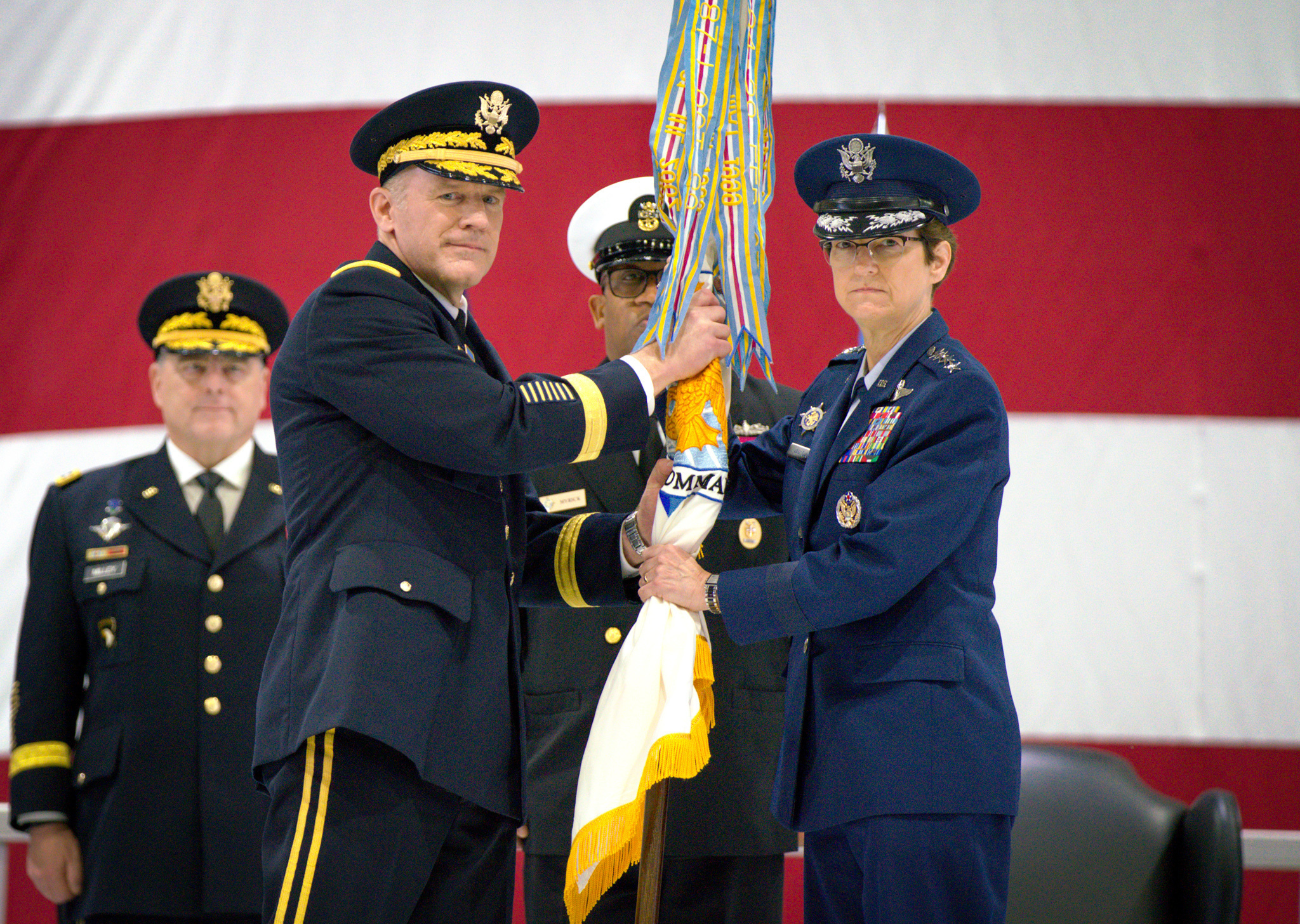
Van Ovost assumes command of USTRANSCOM from General Stephen R. Lyons on October 15, 2021.

=== Early career ===
Van Ovost was commissioned upon graduation from the United States Air Force Academy in 1988. She attended Undergraduate Pilot Training at Reese Air Force Base (now the Reese Technology Center) and graduated in 1989. She is also a graduate of the U.S. Air Force Test Pilot School and is a command pilot with more than 4,200 hours in more than 30 aircraft, including the C-32A, C-17A, C-141B, and KC-135R. Even further, Van Ovost was an Instructor Pilot for the Test Pilot School. Van Ovost's notable military assignments include Vice Commander of the United States Air Force Expeditionary Center (2012–13), Deputy Director for Politico-Military Affairs (Europe, NATO, Russia) in the Strategic Plans and Policy Directorate (J5) of the Joint Staff (2013–15), Vice Director for the Joint Staff (2015-17), Director of Staff at Headquarters Air Force (2017-2020), and Deputy Commander of Air Mobility Command (April 2020-August 2020).

=== Air Mobility Command ===
On July 20, 2020, the Senate confirmed Van Ovost as commander of Air Mobility Command (AMC), a major command (MAJCOM) of the Air Force; Van Ovost also gained her fourth-star. She replaced retiring AMC commanding Gen. Maryanne Miller, under whom she served as AMC's deputy commander, on August 20, 2020. Van Ovost served as AMC Commander until she relinquished command on October 5, 2021. In preparation for her expected confirmation as TRANSCOM head, President Biden nominated United States Indo-Pacific Command (INDOPACOM) deputy commander Lt. Gen. Michael Minihan to replace Van Ovost as AMC commander.

=== Transportation Command nomination ===
On March 6, 2021, Defense Secretary Lloyd Austin announced that President Biden had nominated Van Ovost to become commander of United States Transportation Command (TRANSCOM). Her nomination was sent to the Senate on March 5, 2021. Her nomination was originally recommended by then-Defense Secretary Mark Esper and General Mark Milley, but Esper later delayed it until after the 2020 United States presidential election due to his concerns of the Trump administration's possible reaction against nominating women to such high leadership positions. Van Ovost's nomination hearings to head TRANSCOM were held before the Senate Armed Services Committee on September 23, 2021. She was confirmed by the U.S. Senate by unanimous consent on October 1, 2021 and assumed command on October 15, 2021, becoming the second woman to lead a unified combatant command after General Lori Robinson.

== Awards and decorations ==
U.S. Air Force Command Pilot Badge
Headquarters Air Force Badge
United States Transportation Command Badge
Office of the Joint Chiefs of Staff Identification Badge

Defense Distinguished Service Medal
Air Force Distinguished Service Medal with one bronze oak leaf cluster
Defense Superior Service Medal with oak leaf cluster
Legion of Merit with oak leaf cluster
Bronze Star Medal with oak leaf cluster
Meritorious Service Medal with three oak leaf clusters
Air Medal
Aerial Achievement Medal with oak leaf cluster
Joint Service Commendation Medal
Air Force Commendation Medal
Air Force Achievement Medal with oak leaf cluster
Joint Meritorious Unit Award with oak leaf cluster
Air Force Outstanding Unit Award with silver oak leaf cluster
Air Force Organizational Excellence Award
Air Force Recognition Ribbon
National Defense Service Medal with one bronze service star
Southwest Asia Service Medal with two service stars
Afghanistan Campaign Medal with two service stars
Global War on Terrorism Expeditionary Medal
Global War on Terrorism Service Medal
Armed Forces Service Medal
Nuclear Deterrence Operations Service Medal
Air Force Expeditionary Service Ribbon with gold frame
Air Force Longevity Service Award with one silver and three bronze oak leaf clusters
Air Force Training Ribbon
Kuwait Liberation Medal (Saudi Arabia)
Kuwait Liberation Medal (Kuwait)

== Effective dates of promotion ==
Insignia	Rank	Date
	General	Aug. 20, 2020
	Lieutenant general	Nov. 8, 2017
	Major general	May 22, 2015
	Brigadier general	Aug. 2, 2012
	Colonel	Dec. 1, 2006
	Lieutenant colonel	May 1, 2001
	Major	Aug. 1, 1998
	Captain	June 1, 1992
	First lieutenant	June 1, 1990
	Second lieutenant	June 1, 1988

Military offices
Preceded by Richard M. Clark	Commander of the 12th Flying Training Wing; 2008–2010	Succeeded by Richard Murphy
Preceded by Steven Harrison	Commander of the 89th Airlift Wing; 2010–2012	Succeeded by Michael Minihan
Preceded by Stayce Harris	Director of Staff of the United States Air Force; 2017–2020	Succeeded by Timothy G. Fay
Preceded by Maryanne Miller	Commander of Air Mobility Command; 2020–2021	Succeeded by Michael Minihan
Preceded by Stephen R. Lyons	Commander of United States Transportation Command; 2021–2024	Succeeded by Randall Reed
