= Maryanne Miller =

US Air Force general

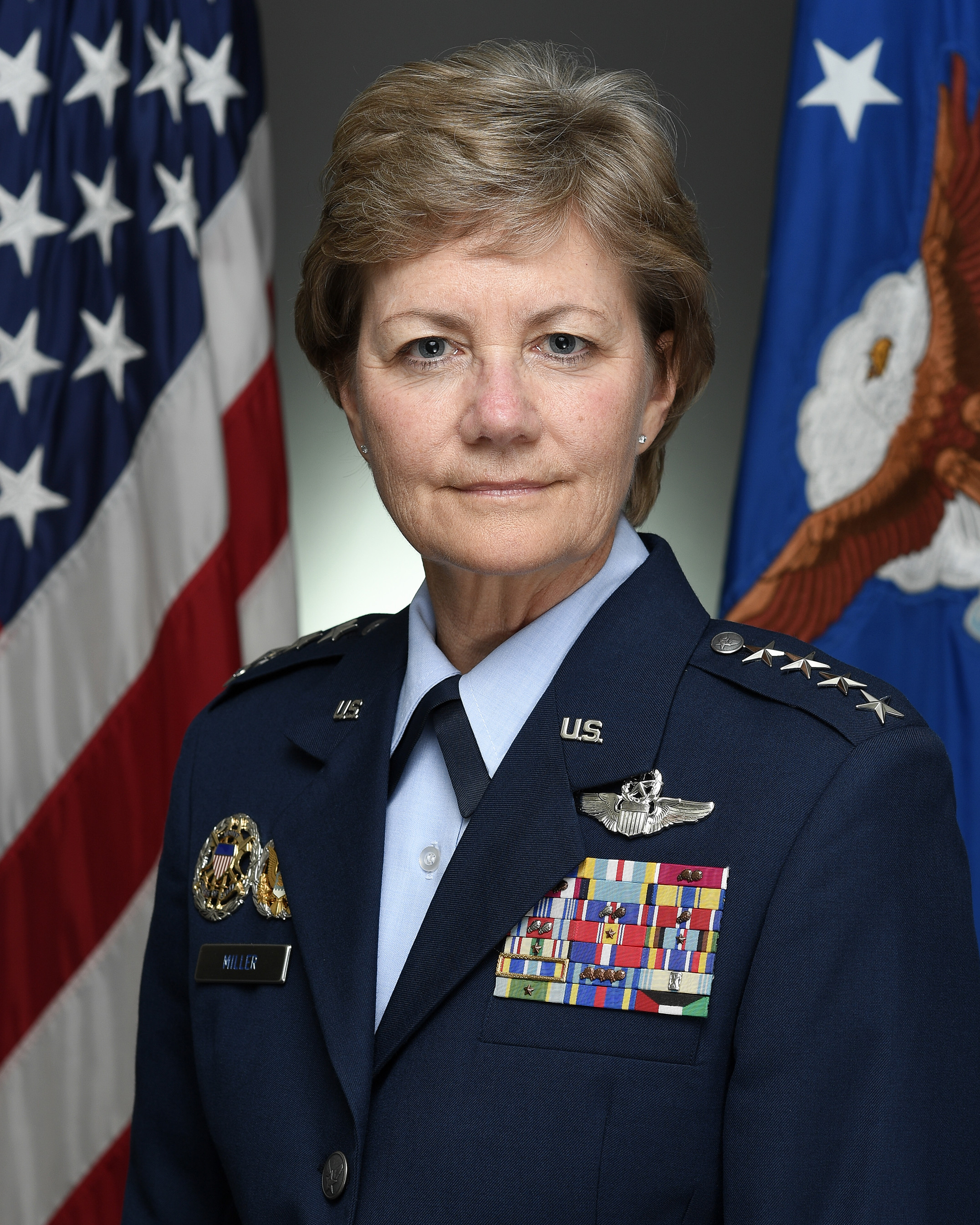
- General Maryanne Miller in 2018
- Born: 1958 or 1959 (age 67–68); Ohio, United States
- Military career
- Allegiance: United States
- Branch: United States Air Force
- Service years: 1981–2020
- Rank: General
- Commands: Air Mobility Command; Air Force Reserve Command; 349th Air Mobility Wing; 932nd Airlift Wing
- Conflicts: Gulf War
- Awards: Air Force Distinguished Service Medal (3); Defense Superior Service Medal; Legion of Merit (3)

Maryanne Miller (born 1958 or 1959) is a retired United States Air Force general and a pilot who last served as the commander of Air Mobility Command at Scott Air Force Base from September 7, 2018 to August 20, 2020. She previously served as the Chief of Air Force Reserve and the commander of Air Force Reserve Command from July 2016 to September 2018. Miller is the first Air Force Reserve officer to achieve the rank of general. She was also the first woman to serve as the Chief of Air Force Reserve. She retired from the Air Force on October 1, 2020 after over 39 years of service.

== Military career ==
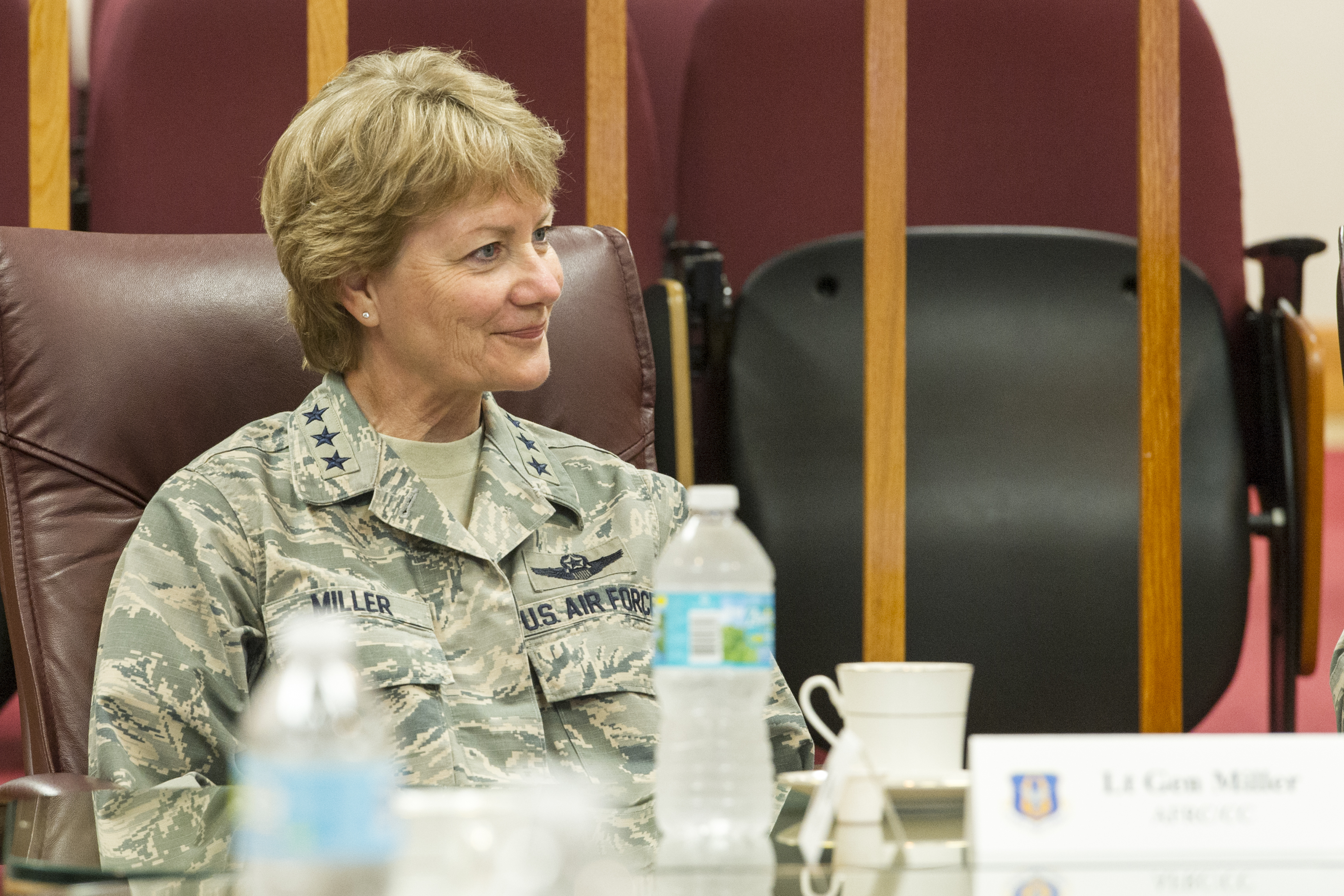
Lt. Gen. Maryanne Miller, Commander Air Force Reserve Command and Chief of the Air Force Reserve, Robins Air Force Base, Georgia, listens to a briefing by Col. David Garfield, Commander, 482nd Fighter Wing during a visit Homestead Air Reserve Base, Florida, October 3, 2017.

A native of Hilliard, Ohio, Miller was commissioned in 1981 as a distinguished graduate of the Air Force Reserve Officer Training Corps program at Ohio State University. She is a command pilot with more than 4,800 flying hours in numerous aircraft.

Miller has commanded two wings and held numerous staff leadership positions at the unit, air staff and joint staff levels. Prior to her current assignment, she was the Chief of Air Force Reserve, Headquarters United States Air Force, Washington, D.C., and Commander of Air Force Reserve Command, Robins Air Force Base.

In 2019, Miller was the only female 4-star officer serving in the United States military. She retired from the US Air Force on October 1, 2020.

== Education ==
- 1981 Bachelor of Arts degree in criminal justice (minor in sociology,) Ohio State University, Columbus, Ohio
- 1983 Squadron Officer School, Maxwell AFB, Ala.
- 1986 Flight Safety Officer School, Norton AFB, Calif.
- 1994 Air Command and Staff College, Maxwell AFB, Ala.
- 2004 Air War College, by correspondence
- 2006 Director of Mobility Forces Course, Hurlburt Field, Fla.
- 2009 Senior Reserve Component Officers Course, United States Army War College, Carlisle, Pa.
- 2011 Seminar XXI, Center for International Studies, Massachusetts Institute for Technology, Washington D.C.
- 2011 Master's degree in business administration, Trident University, Calif.
- 2012 Senior Executives in National and International Security, Harvard Kennedy School, Cambridge, Mass.
- 2017 Senior Joint Information Operations Applications Course, Air University, Curtis E. LeMay Center for Doctrine Development and Education, Maxwell AFB, Ala.

== Assignments ==
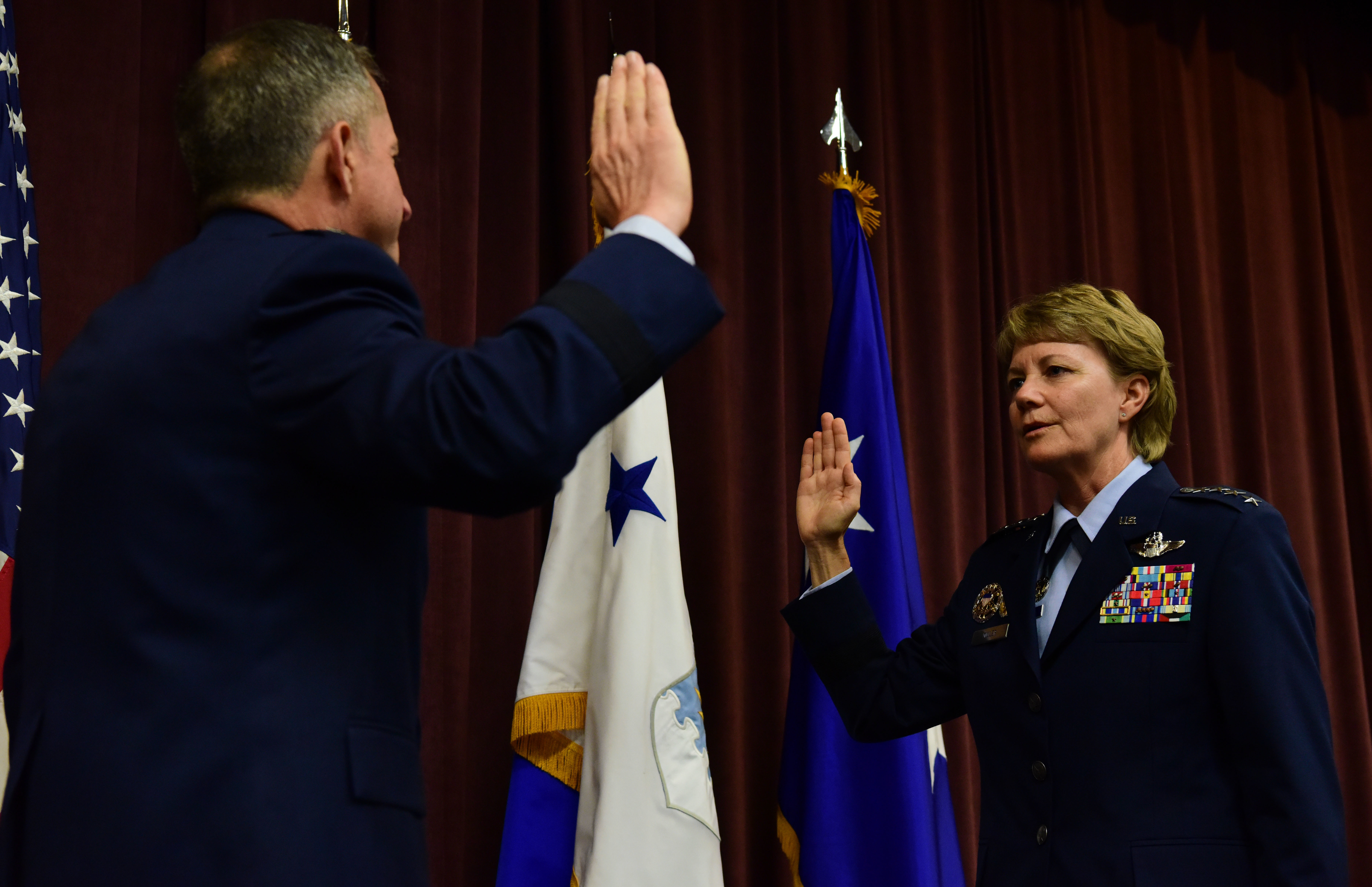
Miller is sworn in as commander of Air Mobility Command by Air Force Chief of Staff Gen. David L. Goldfein during a promotion ceremony at Scott Air Force Base, Illinois, September 7, 2018.

1. September 1981 – August 1982, Student, undergraduate pilot training, Williams AFB, Ariz.
2. August 1982 – March 1983, Instructor Pilot student, Randolph AFB, Texas
3. March 1983 – July 1984, T-37 Instructor Pilot and RSU supervisor, Williams AFB, Ariz.
4. July 1984 – January 1985, T-37 Check Pilot and RSU Supervisor, Williams AFB, Ariz.
5. January 1985 – March 1985, Student, Squadron Officer School, Maxwell AFB, Ala.
6. March 1985 – February 1986, Executive Officer for 96th FTS Commander, T-37 Instructor Pilot, Williams AFB, Ariz.
7. February 1986 – July 1986, Student, distinguished graduate C-141 training, Altus AFB, Okla.
8. July 1986 – July 1987, C-141 Aircraft Commander and Executive Officer for 8th Airlift Squadron Commander, McChord AFB, Wash.
9. July 1987 – June 1988, C-141 Instructor Pilot, 8th Airlift Squadron McChord AFB, Wash.
10. June 1988 – July 1989, Chief of Flying Safety and C-141 Examiner Pilot, McChord AFB, Wash.
11. July 1989 – September 1993, C-141 Examiner Pilot, 313th Airlift Squadron, McChord AFB, Wash.
12. September 1993 – April 1994, Deputy Operations Group Commander, 459th Airlift Wing, Andrews AFB, Md.
13. April 1994 – October 1995, Operations Officer, 756th Airlift Squadron, Andrews AFB, Md.
14. October 1995 – October 1996, Chief, Strategic Airlift, Reserve Operations, Headquarters U.S. Air Force, Washington, D.C.
15. October 1996 – January 1998, Fighter Forces Programmer, Reserve Plans and Programs, Headquarters U.S. Air Force, Washington, D.C.
16. January 1998 – December 2001, Operations Officer and Deputy Operations Group Commander, 459th Airlift Wing, Andrews AFB, Md.
17. December 2001 – May 2004, Air Reserve Technician C-5 pilot, Dover AFB, Del.
18. May 2004 – January 2006, Operations Group Commander, 932nd Airlift Wing, Scott AFB, Ill.
19. January 2006 – January 2008, Commander, 932nd Airlift Wing, Scott AFB, Ill.
20. January 2008 – November 2009, Commander, 349th Air Mobility Wing, Travis AFB, Calif.
21. November 2009 – January 2012, Director of Programs and Requirements, Office of the Air Force Reserve, Headquarters U.S. Air Force, Washington, D.C.
22. January 2012 – September 2013, Deputy Director of Partnership Strategy, J5, the Pentagon, Washington, D.C.
23. April 2012 – August 2012, Interim Deputy Director for Trans Regional Policy, J5, the Pentagon, Washington, D.C.
24. September 2013 – July 2016, Deputy to the Chief of Air Force Reserve, Headquarters U.S Air Force, Washington, D.C.
25. July 2016 – September 2018, Chief of Air Force Reserve, Headquarters U.S. Air Force, Washington, D.C., and Commander of Air Force Reserve Command, Robins AFB, Ga.
26. September 2018 – August 2020, Commander, Air Mobility Command, Scott Air Force Base, Ill.

== Flight information ==
Rating: Command Pilot
Flight hours: more than 4,800
Aircraft flown: T-37, T-38, C-141B/C, C-5A/B, C-9A/C, C-40C, KC-10A and C-17

== Awards and decorations ==
US Air Force Command Pilot Badge
Office of the Joint Chiefs of Staff Identification Badge
Headquarters Air Force Badge

Air Force Distinguished Service Medal with two bronze oak leaf clusters
Defense Superior Service Medal
Legion of Merit with two oak leaf clusters
Meritorious Service Medal with four oak leaf clusters
Aerial Achievement Medal
Air Force Commendation Medal
Air Force Achievement Medal
Air Force Outstanding Unit Award with one silver and one bronze oak leaf clusters
Air Force Organizational Excellence Award with oak leaf cluster
Combat Readiness Medal with two silver oak leaf clusters
National Defense Service Medal with one bronze service star
Armed Forces Expeditionary Medal with service star
Southwest Asia Service Medal with service star
Kosovo Campaign Medal
Global War on Terrorism Service Medal
Air Force Expeditionary Service Ribbon with gold frame
Air Force Longevity Service Award with four oak leaf clusters
Armed Forces Reserve Medal with silver Hourglass device
Small Arms Expert Marksmanship Ribbon with service star
Air Force Training Ribbon
Kuwait Liberation Medal from Kuwait

== Effective dates of promotion ==
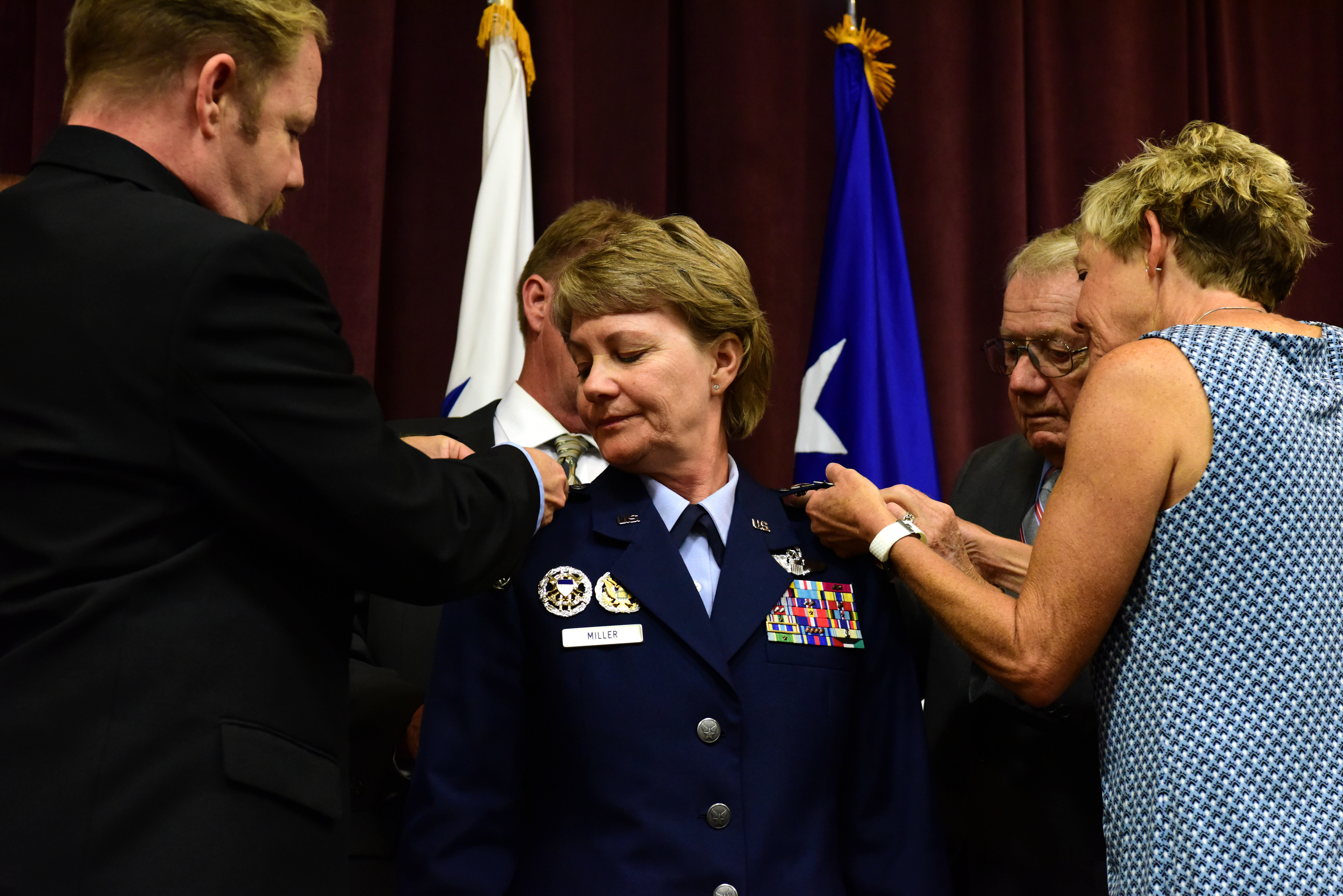
Members of Gen. Maryanne Miller’s family pin on her fourth star during a promotion ceremony at Scott Air Force Base, Illinois, September 7, 2018.

Insignia	Rank	Date
	General	September 7, 2018
	Lieutenant general	July 15, 2016
	Major general	January 1, 2013
	Brigadier general	June 1, 2009
	Colonel	February 17, 2005
	Lieutenant colonel	June 13, 1996
	Major	March 5, 1992
	Captain	August 30, 1985
	First lieutenant	August 30, 1983
	Second lieutenant	June 12, 1981

Military offices
Preceded by Carlton D. Everhart II	Commander, Air Mobility Command; 2018–2020	Succeeded by Jacqueline D. Van Ovost
Preceded by James F. Jackson	Commander, Air Force Reserve Command; 2016 – 2018	Succeeded by Richard W. Scobee
