= Mike Minihan =

American Air Force general

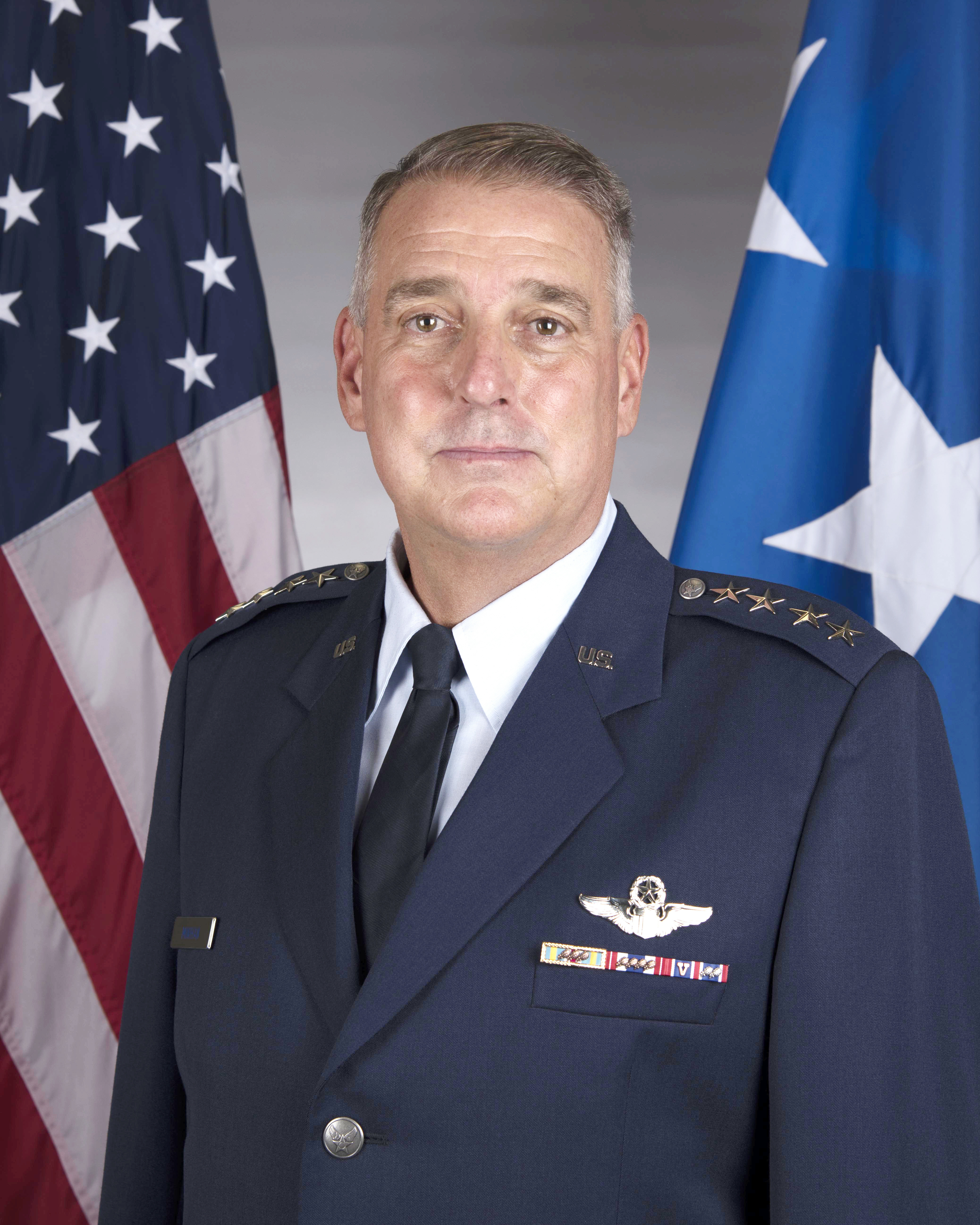
- Official portrait, 2021
- Born: 1967 (age 58–59)
- Military career
- Allegiance: United States
- Branch: United States Air Force
- Service years: 1989–2024
- Rank: General
- Commands: Air Mobility Command; 89th Airlift Wing; 19th Airlift Wing
- Conflicts: Iraq War
- Awards: Defense Distinguished Service Medal; Defense Superior Service Medal (2); Legion of Merit (3)

Michael A. Minihan (born 1967) is an American retired United States Air Force general who served as the commander of Air Mobility Command from 2021 to 2024.

== Career ==
Minihan was commissioned in 1989 through Air Force ROTC at Auburn University in Alabama, where he earned a Bachelor of Science in economics. He began his service in the Air Force as a Lockheed C-130 Hercules pilot.

From 2013 to 2021, Minihan held multiple key roles in the Pacific. He served as the deputy commander of United States Indo-Pacific Command from September 2019 to August 2021. He previously served as its chief of staff from January 2019 to September 2019.

On July 26, 2018, Minihan, while serving as the chief of staff at United Nations Command, led a delegation to the Democratic People's Republic of Korea to recover the remains of service members killed during the Korean War. The mission came after negotiations between Kim Jong Un, the leader of North Korea, and President Donald J. Trump.

In July 2021, he was nominated and confirmed for promotion to general and assignment as the commander of Air Mobility Command, succeeding Gen. Jacqueline Van Ovost, who has been nominated to head United States Transportation Command.

During his time commanding Air Mobility Command, Minihan re-envisioned Exercise Mobility Guardian in 2023, transitioning the exercise from a service-specific test of air mobility and logistics training executed over the continental United States to a joint and combined large-scale exercise in the Pacific. He also oversaw the rapid deployment of assistance to Ukraine, and later to Israel and Gaza.

On Jan 28, 2022, Minihan attracted attention online when he posted on Twitter a screen shot of his personal calendar revealing a mental health appointment with the text, "Warrior Heart. No Stigma." Minihan later stated to Air and Space Forces Magazine of the post, “I’m only holding myself accountable to the same standards I expect from the amazing airmen and families that surround me. Mental health is simply health. There can be no stigma in my headquarters, command, or family. Warrior Heart is leadership. Warrior Heart is fine tuning mind, body, and craft to ensure individual and team readiness. It’s a wingman and warfighting imperative necessary to win.”

On May 2, 2024, the enlisted force of Air Mobility Command bestowed their most prestigious honor—the Order of the Sword—to Minihan. AMC command chief, CMSgt Jamie Newman stated during the presentation, “Great leaders walk in front of you, beside you, and behind you,” said Newman. “When I first heard that, the first person I thought of was General Minihan,” before recounting several stories he personally experienced and witnessed. The common theme of the stories included connectedness and genuine care for anyone who crosses his path regardless of the rank. Minihan's father, Lt Gen Kenneth Minihan also received the honor in 1994.

Minihan retired in 2024.

== Controversies ==
In January 2023, a memo written by Minihan to his subordinate commanders leaked on social media predicting that China would invade Taiwan in 2025 using the 2024 presidential elections in Taiwan and the United States as an excuse and a distraction respectively. He also directed his command to prepare with more aggressive training and in respect to their personal affairs.

His Commander's Intent stated, "Go faster. Drive readiness, integration, and agility for ourselves and the Joint Force to deter, and if required, defeat China. This is the first of 8 monthly directives from me. You need to know I alone own the pen on these orders. My expectations are high, and these orders are not up for negotiation. Follow them. I will be tough, fair, and loving in my approach to secure victory." An official at the United States Department of Defense later told NBC News that Minihan's memo was "not representative of the department's view on China." Minihan later clarified via the Washington Post that he did not believe war with China was inevitable.

== Awards and decorations ==
US Air Force Command Pilot Badge
Air Force Basic Manpower and Personnel Badge
Headquarters Air Force Badge

Defense Distinguished Service Medal
Defense Superior Service Medal with one bronze oak leaf cluster
Legion of Merit with two oak leaf clusters
Meritorious Service Medal with three oak leaf clusters
Air Medal with silver oak leaf cluster
Aerial Achievement Medal with one silver and one bronze oak leaf clusters
Air Force Commendation Medal
Air Force Achievement Medal
Joint Meritorious Unit Award with three oak leaf clusters
Air Force Meritorious Unit Award with four oak leaf clusters
Air Force Outstanding Unit Award with Valor device and two silver oak leaf clusters
Air Force Organizational Excellence Award
Combat Readiness Medal with two oak leaf clusters
Air Force Recognition Ribbon
National Defense Service Medal with one bronze service star
Armed Forces Expeditionary Medal with two service stars
Southwest Asia Service Medal with service star
Kosovo Campaign Medal with two service stars
Iraq Campaign Medal with service star
Global War on Terrorism Expeditionary Medal
Global War on Terrorism Service Medal
Korea Defense Service Medal
Armed Forces Service Medal with service star
Humanitarian Service Medal with service star
Nuclear Deterrence Operations Service Medal
Air Force Overseas Short Tour Service Ribbon with oak leaf cluster
Air Force Overseas Long Tour Service Ribbon with two oak leaf clusters
Air Force Expeditionary Service Ribbon with gold frame and three oak leaf clusters
Air Force Longevity Service Award with one silver and two bronze oak leaf clusters
Small Arms Expert Marksmanship Ribbon
Air Force Training Ribbon
Order of National Security Merit, Cheonsu Medal (Korea)
NATO Medal for the Balkans (non-article 5)

- General Minihan is also a recipient of the Order of Saint Maurice.

== Effective dates of promotions ==
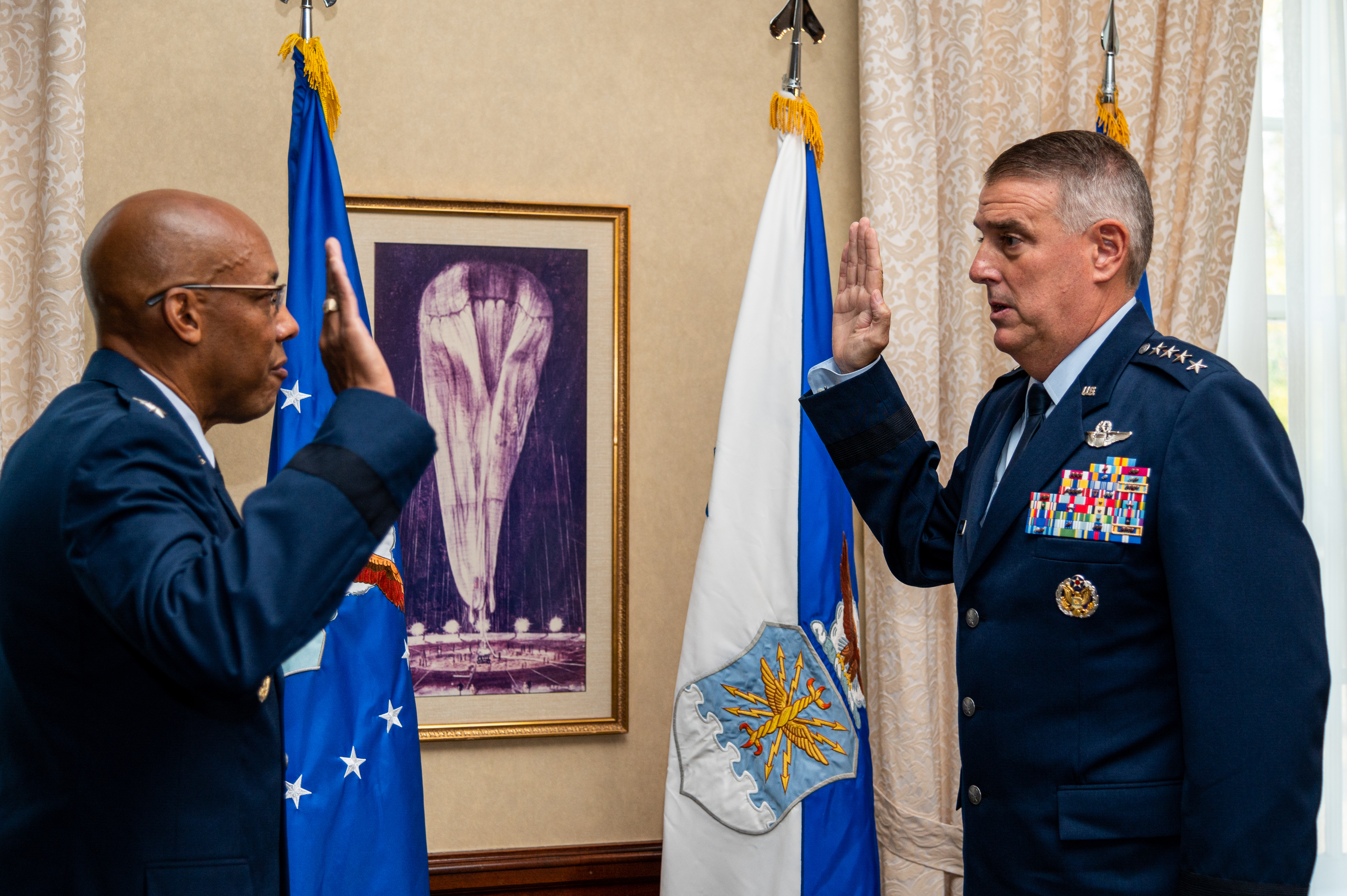
Minihan is administered the reaffirmation oath by General Charles Q. Brown Jr., chief of staff of the Air Force after his promotion to general, on October 4, 2021.

Rank	Date
Second Lieutenant	November 12, 1989
First Lieutenant	November 12, 1991
Captain	November 12, 1993
Major	March 1, 2001
Lieutenant Colonel	April 1, 2004
Colonel	September 1, 2007
Brigadier General	March 2, 2015
Major General	July 3, 2018
Lieutenant General	September 27, 2019
General	October 5, 2021

Military offices
Preceded by Gregory S. Otey	Commander of the 19th Airlift Wing; 2010–2012	Succeeded by Brian S. Robinson
Preceded by Jacqueline Van Ovost	Commander of the 89th Airlift Wing; 2012–2013	Succeeded by David L. Almand
Preceded by Dirk D. Smith	Deputy Director for Operations of the United States Indo-Pacific Command; 2015–2017	Succeeded by Dagvin Anderson
Preceded by James C. Slife	Chief of Staff of the United States Forces Korea; 2017–2019	Succeeded by Stephen C. Williams
Preceded by Kevin Schneider	Chief of Staff of the United States Indo-Pacific Command; 2019	Succeeded by Ronald P. Clark
Preceded by Bryan P. Fenton	Deputy Commander of the United States Indo-Pacific Command; 2019–2021	Succeeded by Stephen D. Sklenka
Preceded by Jacqueline Van Ovost	Commander of the Air Mobility Command; 2021–2024	Succeeded by John Lamontagne
