= Timothy G. Fay =

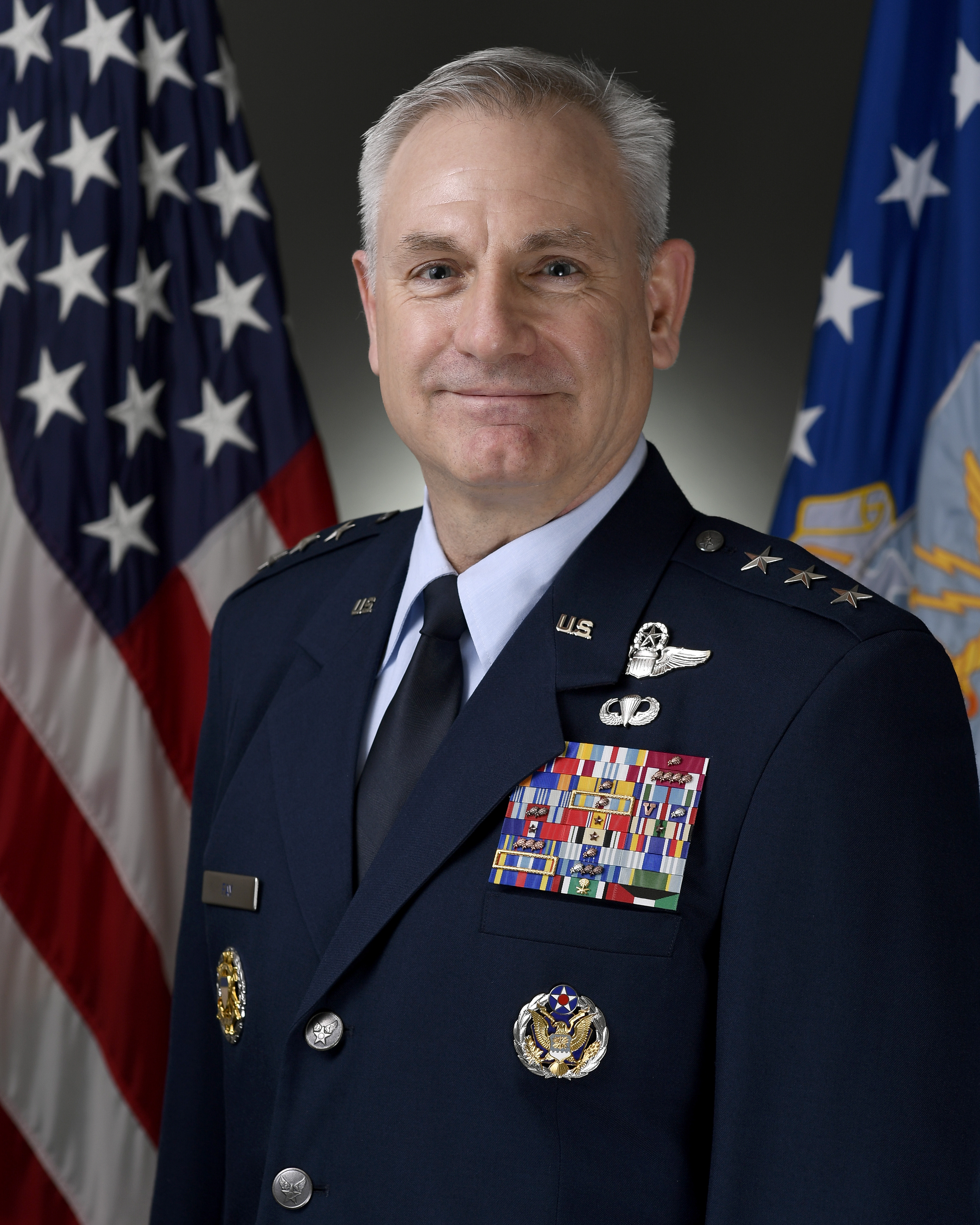
- Education: United States Air Force Academy (BS); University of Belgrano (MA); National War College (MA)
- Military career
- Allegiance: United States
- Branch: United States Air Force
- Service years: 1990–2021
- Rank: Lieutenant General
- Commands: Director of Staff of the United States Air Force; 2nd Bomb Wing; 2nd Operations Group; 65th Operations Support Squadron
- Conflicts: Gulf War; Operation Allied Force; Iraq War
- Awards: Air Force Distinguished Service Medal (2); Defense Superior Service Medal; Legion of Merit; Bronze Star Medal

Timothy George Fay is a retired United States Air Force lieutenant general who last served as the Director of Staff of the United States Air Force from 2020 to 2021. Prior to this, he was the deputy chief of staff for strategy, integration and requirements from 2018 to 2020.

Fay was commissioned after graduation from the United States Air Force Academy in 1987. His swear in ceremony was held on July 6, 2022, with an effective date of September 1, 2021.

== Dates of promotion ==
Rank	Branch	Date
Second lieutenant	Air Force	27 May 1987
First lieutenant	Air Force	27 May 1989
Captain	Air Force	27 May 1991
Major	Air Force	1 November 1998
Lieutenant colonel	Air Force	1 February 2003
Colonel	Air Force	1 January 2007
Brigadier general	Air Force	2 October 2012
Major general	Air Force	2 October 2015
Lieutenant general	Air Force	1 October 2018

== Awards and decorations ==
US Air Force Command Pilot Badge
Basic Parachutist Badge
Headquarters Air Force Badge
Office of the Joint Chiefs of Staff Identification Badge

Air Force Distinguished Service Medal
Defense Superior Service Medal
Legion of Merit with one bronze oak leaf cluster
Bronze Star Medal
Defense Meritorious Service Medal
Meritorious Service Medal with four oak leaf clusters
Air Medal
Air Force Commendation Medal with oak leaf cluster
Joint Service Achievement Medal
Air Force Achievement Medal
Joint Meritorious Unit Award with oak leaf cluster
Air Force Outstanding Unit Award with "V" device and silver oak leaf cluster
Combat Readiness Medal with two oak leaf clusters
National Defense Service Medal with one bronze service star
Southwest Asia Service Medal with oak leaf cluster
Kosovo Campaign Medal with service star
Iraq Campaign Medal with service star
Global War on Terrorism Service Medal
Nuclear Deterrence Operations Service Medal with three oak leaf clusters
Air Force Overseas Short Tour Service Ribbon with oak leaf cluster
Air Force Overseas Long Tour Service Ribbon
Air Force Expeditionary Service Ribbon with gold frame
Air Force Longevity Service Award with silver and two bronze oak leaf clusters
Small Arms Expert Marksmanship Ribbon
Air Force Training Ribbon
Kuwait Liberation Medal (Saudi Arabia)
Kuwait Liberation Medal (Kuwait)

Military offices
Preceded by Steven L. Basham	Commander to the 2nd Bomb Wing; 2010–2012	Succeeded by Andrew Gebara
Preceded by ???	Deputy Commander of the United States Air Forces in Europe – Air Forces Africa; 2017–2018	Succeeded by Jeffrey L. Harrigian
Preceded by Robert Spalding	Special Assistant to the Vice Chief of Staff of the United States Air Force; 2018	Succeeded by Lee Levy II
Preceded by ???	Deputy Chief of Staff for Strategy, Integration and Requirements of the United States Air Force; 2018–2020	Succeeded by Michael Fantini; Acting
Preceded by Jacqueline Van Ovost	Director of Staff of the United States Air Force; 2020–2021	Succeeded by Kevin Schneider
