= Scott L. Pleus =

American Air Force Lieutenant general

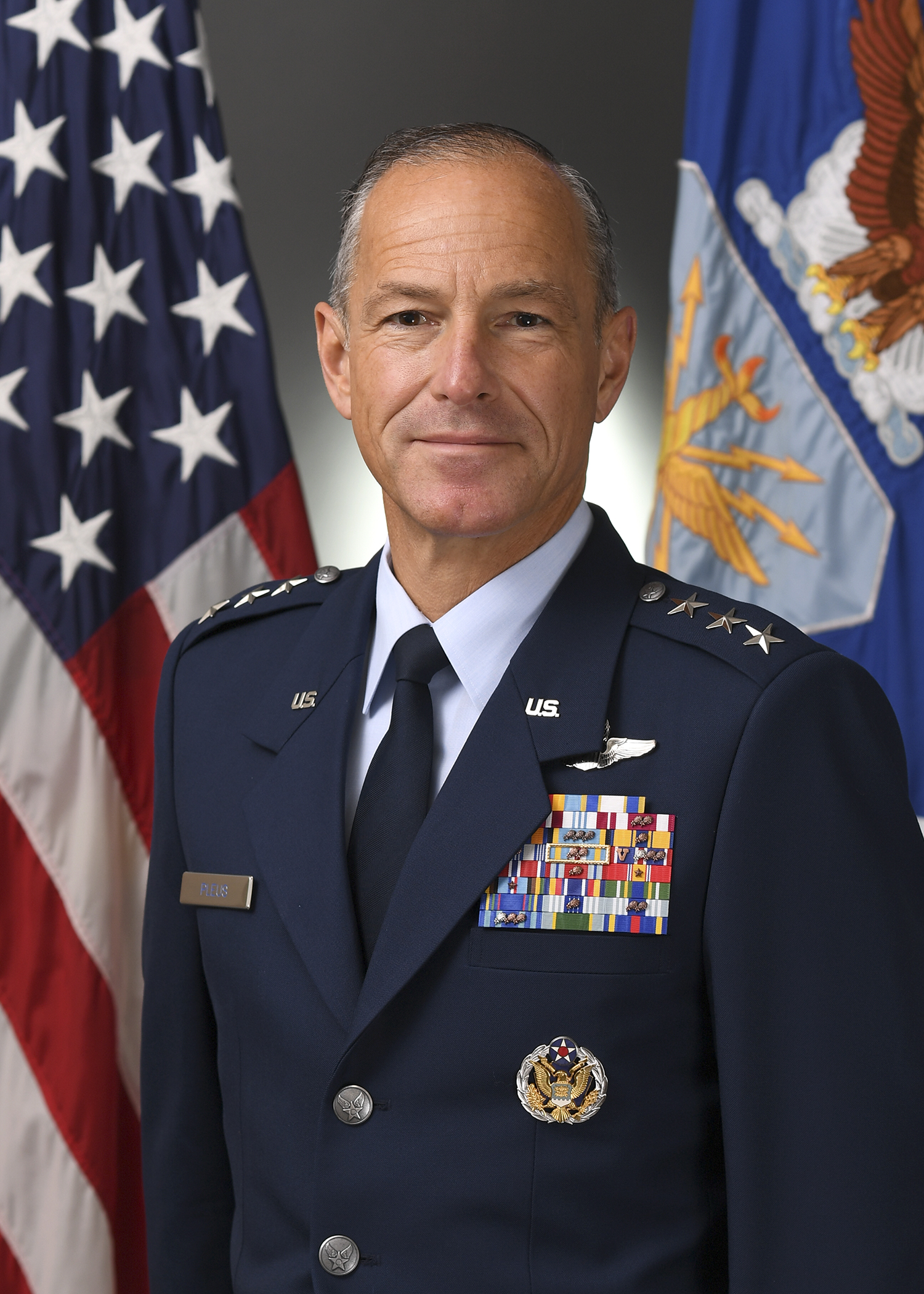
- Official portrait, 2024
- Born: c. 1967 (age 58–59)
- Alma mater: University of Minnesota-Duluth (BA) Air Command and Staff College (MA) Auburn University (MA)
- Military career
- Allegiance: United States
- Branch: United States Air Force
- Service years: 1989–2026
- Rank: Lieutenant General
- Nickname: Rolls
- Commands: Seventh Air Force; 56th Fighter Wing; 8th Fighter Wing; 611th Air and Space Operations Center; 63rd Fighter Squadron
- Awards: Defense Distinguished Service Medal; Air Force Distinguished Service Medal; Legion of Merit (4)

Scott L. Pleus (born c. 1967) is a retired lieutenant general in the United States Air Force. For his final active duty assignment, he served as the director of staff of the United States Air Force, and was the longest-serving Acting Vice Chief of Staff of the United States Air Force in the U.S. Air Force's 79-year history from February 2025 to February 2026.

== Air Force career ==
Pleus received his commission in 1989 through the Air Force ROTC program at the University of Minnesota Duluth. During his career, he commanded at the squadron, group and wing levels and was a Secretary of Defense Corporate Fellow at Sun Microsystems in California. His staff assignments include Executive Officer to the Chief of Staff of the United States Air Force. Prior to his final assignment in the U.S. Air Force, he was the deputy commander of United States Forces Korea, commander of the Air Component Command, United Nations Command, commander of the Air Component Command, Combined Forces Command, and commander of the Seventh Air Force at Osan Air Base, Republic of Korea.

=== Flight career ===
Pleus finished his career as a Command Pilot with more than 2,500 operational hours in the sky. He flew combat missions in Operations Desert Fox and Southern Watch. Over his lengthy Pilot career he flew the F-35, F-16 C/D, AT-38, T-38, and T-37.

== Education ==
- 1989 Bachelor of Arts, Communications, University of Minnesota-Duluth 1997 Squadron Officer School, Maxwell Air Force Base, Ala.
- 2000 Master of Military Operational Arts and Science, Air Command and Staff College, Maxwell AFB, Ala. 2000 Master of Arts, International Relations, Auburn University-Montgomery, Ala.
- 2002 Air War College, Maxwell Air Force Base, Ala., by correspondence
- 2008 Secretary of Defense Corporate Fellow, Sun Microsystems, Menlo Park, Calif.
- 2010 U.S. Air Force Enterprise Leadership Seminar, Darden School of Business, University of Virginia, Charlottesville 2015 Capstone General and Flag Officer Course, National Defense University, Washington, D.C.
- 2015 Joint Force Air Component Commander Course, Maxwell AFB, Ala. 2018 Joint Flag Officer Warfighting Course, Maxwell AFB, Ala.

== Assignments ==
- March 1990 – March 1991, Student, undergraduate pilot training, Columbus Air Force Base, Miss.
- April 1991 – December 1992, Student, F-16 Replacement Training Unit, MacDill AFB, Fla.
- January 1993 – January 1996, F-16 Pilot, 18th Fighter Squadron, Eielson AFB, Alaska
- January 1996 – December 1996, F-16 Flight Examiner and Instructor, 35th Fighter Squadron, Kunsan Air Base, South Korea
- January 1997 – June 1999, Flight Commander, F-16 Flight Examiner and Instructor, 34th Fighter Squadron, Hill AFB, Utah
- June 1999 – June 2000, Student, Air Command and Staff College, Maxwell AFB, Ala.
- July 2000 – September 2000, Student, Joint Forces Staff College, Norfolk Naval Air Station, Va.
- September 2000 – November 2002, Joint and Combined Contingency Plans Officer, Alaskan Command, Plans and Programs, Joint Base Elmendorf-Richardson, Alaska
- November 2002 – April 2003, Student, F-16 requalification training, 61st Fighter Squadron, Luke AFB, Ariz.
- May 2003 – June 2004, Operations Officer, 56th Training Squadron, Luke AFB, Ariz.
- June 2004 – June 2006, Commander, 63rd Fighter Squadron, Luke AFB, Ariz.
- 12, June 2006 – June 2008, Director, Headquarters AETC Command Action Group, Randolph AFB, Texas
- June 2008 – July 2009, Secretary of Defense Corporate Fellow, Sun Microsystems, Menlo Park, Calif.
- July 2009 – May 2011, Commander, 611th Air and Space Operations Center, JB Elmendorf-Richardson, Alaska
- May 2011 – May 2012, Commander, 8th Fighter Wing, Kunsan AB, South Korea
- June 2012 – June 2014, Executive Officer to the Chief of Staff of the Air Force, Headquarters U.S. Air Force, the Pentagon, Arlington, Va.
- June 2014 – June 2016, Commander, 56th Fighter Wing, Luke AFB, Ariz.
- July 2016 – May 2017, Director, F-35 Integration Office, Headquarters U.S. Air Force, the Pentagon, Arlington, Va.
- June 2017 – May 2019, Director, Plans, Programs, and Requirements, Headquarters Air Combat Command, Joint Base Langley-Eustis, Va.
- June 2019 – June 2020, Director of Air and Cyberspace Operations, Headquarters Pacific Air Forces, JB Pearl Harbor-Hickam, Hawaii
- June 2020 – January 2024, Deputy Commander, United States Forces Korea; Commander, Air Component Command, United Nations Command; Commander, Air Component Command, Combined Forces Command; and Commander, Seventh Air Force, Pacific Air Forces, Osan AB, Republic of Korea
- January 2024 – February 2025, Director of Staff, Headquarters U.S. Air Force, the Pentagon, Arlington, Va.
- February 2025 - February 2026, acting Vice Chief of Staff of the Air Force, Headquarters U.S. Air Force, the Pentagon, Arlington, Va.
- February 2026 - July 2026, Director of Staff, Headquarters U.S. Air Force, the Pentagon, Arlington, Va.
- August 2026 - Retired

== Effective dates of promotions ==
Rank	Date
Second Lieutenant	2 November 1989
First Lieutenant	2 November 1991
Captain	2 November 1993
Major	1 July 1999
Lieutenant Colonel	1 March 2003
Colonel	1 August 2008
Brigadier General	11 July 2014
Major General	2 May 2018
Lieutenant General	12 June 2020

Military offices
Preceded by Donald E. Kirkland	Executive Officer of the Chief of Staff of the United States Air Force; 2012–2014	Succeeded by Heather L. Pringle
Preceded by Michael D. Rothstein	Commander of the 56th Fighter Wing; 2014–2016	Succeeded by Brook J. Leonard
Preceded by Jeffrey L. Harrigian	Director of the F-35 Integration Office of the United States Air Force; 2016–2017	Succeeded by Todd Canterbury
Preceded by Russell L. Mack	Director of Plans, Programs, and Requirements of the Air Combat Command; 2017–2019	Succeeded by Patrick J. Doherty
Preceded by Stephen C. Williams	Director of Air and Cyberspace Operations of the Pacific Air Forces; 2019–2020	Succeeded by Lansing Pilch
Preceded by Kenneth S. Wilsbach	Commander of the Seventh Air Force; 2020–2024	Succeeded by David R. Iverson
Preceded by James C. Slife	Vice Chief of Staff of the United States Air Force; Acting; 2025–2026	Succeeded by John D. Lamontagne
Preceded by Kevin B. Schneider	Director of Staff of the United States Air Force; 2024–2026	Succeeded by Andrew Gebara
Incumbent
