= Gorton High School =

Coordinates: 40.950239°N 73.889011°W

- Gorton High School
- 100 Shonnard Place; Yonkers, New York 10703; United States

Information
- Other names: GHS or G-High
- Type: Public High School
- Established: 1923
- School district: Yonkers Public Schools
- Principal: Mr. Jamie Morales
- Staff: 68.73 (FTE)
- Grades: 9-12
- Enrollment: 1,080 (2023-2024)
- Student to teacher ratio: 15.71
- Color: Green White
- Athletics: Gorton Wolves
- Mascot: Wolf
- Website: www.yonkerspublicschools.org/gorton

Gorton High School (GHS or G-High) is a public high school for grades 9–12, in Yonkers, New York, operated by the Yonkers Public Schools.

== History ==
Groundbreaking for Gorton High School started in December 1922. The school opened in 1924. Eighty-six classes have graduated from the Shonnard Place campus. The school has two gymnasiums, a cafeteria, a two-level auditorium, a garage, a computer science lab, a medical lab, and a courtroom. The campus is completed with a full-sized track, an athletic field, and a stadium that houses athletic events. The Commercial Horticulture Academy has landscaped a Gorton "G" into the school's front lawn.

Gorton High School was named after Charles Eugene Gorton, Yonkers' second Schools Superintendent.

== Campus ==
The school is located on a geographically contiguous city block in North-West Yonkers. It occupies a campus enclosed by Shonnard Place to the North, Park Avenue to the East, Palisade Avenue to the West and Convent Place to the South. As of 2011, the school has an enrollment of approximately 1,155 students from grades 9 to 12, and over 100 faculty members.

== Curriculum ==
Gorton is home to the Academy of Information Technology, the Law and Public Service Academy, the Medical and Health Professionals Academy, and the Commercial Horticulture Academy. Each academy has a partnership or affiliation with a number of outside organizations and businesses. The academies have been instrumental in assisting career minded Gorton graduates to achieve their career goals.

== Newspaper article ==
During the year 2011 an article titled 'Regions Aging Schools Crumble as Finances Falter' by Cathey O'Donnell and Gary Stern, was featured in the local newspaper, The Journal News, which is well known throughout the Lower Hudson Valley of Westchester County, New York. The article was about several old school buildings within the region that were in a current state of disrepair, how much it would cost to fix them, and which if any might need to be demolished. One of the schools mentioned in the article was Gorton E. High School. Some interior pictures of the school were also featured in the article.

== Notable alumni ==
- Warren Casey, theater composer and writer
- Hans H. Driessnack, United States Air Force general
- Vincent W. Lanna, U.S. Army major general
- Joel Steinberg (born 1941), attorney convicted of manslaughter

== In popular culture ==
- Gorton High School was said to have been an inspiration for Rydell High in Grease as writer Warren Casey had attended Gorton.
