= Hans H. Driessnack =

US Air Force general (1927–2006)

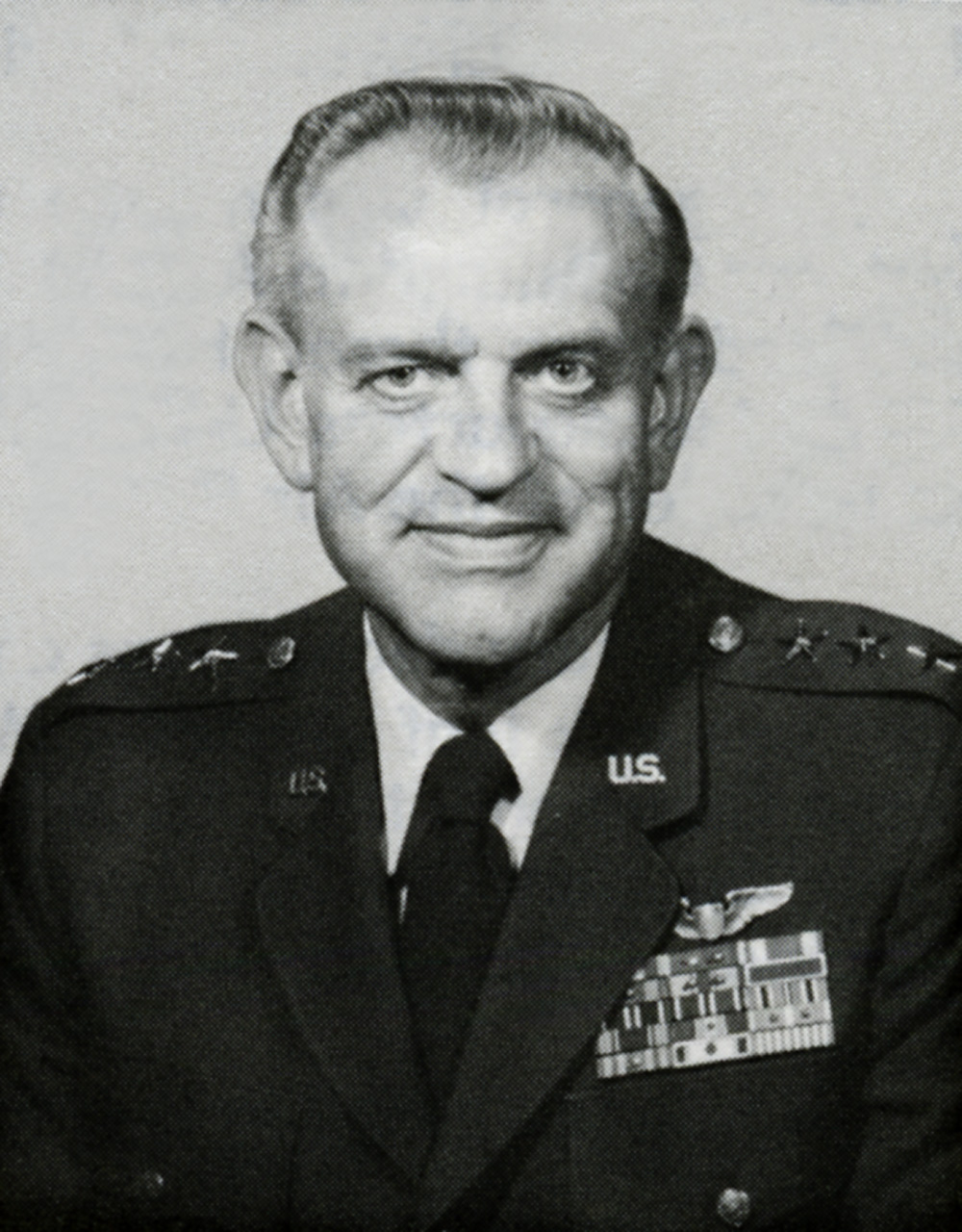
- Lieutenant General Hans H. Driessnack
- Born: August 11, 1927; Yonkers, New York
- Died: October 16, 2006 (aged 79); Sterling, Virginia
- Military career
- Allegiance: United States of America
- Branch: United States Air Force
- Service years: 1951–1983
- Rank: Lieutenant general
- Units: 428th Fighter-Bomber Squadron; 517th Strategic Fighter Squadron; 407th Strategic Fighter Wing; Office of the Deputy Chief of Staff, Comptroller; Office of the Assistant Secretary of the Air Force; Office of the Deputy Chief of Staff, Comptroller
- Commands: Comptroller of the Air Force
- Conflicts: Korean War
- Awards: Air Force Distinguished Service Medal; Legion of Merit (3); Meritorious Service Medal; Air Medal (2); Air Force Commendation Medal (3); Presidential Unit Citation; Air Force Outstanding Unit Award; Air Force Organizational Excellence Award; Republic of Korea Presidential Unit Citation

Hans Helmuth Driessnack (August 11, 1927 – October 16, 2006) was a lieutenant general in the United States Air Force, in which he served as a fighter pilot and later, Comptroller of the Air Force.

== Early life and education ==
Driessnack was born in Yonkers, New York in 1927, and graduated from Charles E. Gorton High School in 1945. In 1951, he received a Bachelor of Science degree in civil engineering from Syracuse University, where he was enrolled in the AFROTC. He was also a member of the Syracuse Orange men's crew from 1947 to 1950. In 1959, he received a master's degree in business administration from the Air Force Institute of Technology at Wright-Patterson Air Force Base in Ohio.

== Military service ==
After graduating from Syracuse and the AFROTC program, Driessnack was commissioned as a second lieutenant in March 1951. He served as a base civil engineering officer until October, 1952, at which time he entered the pilot training program at Goodfellow Air Force Base, Texas. In the spring of 1953, having completed combat crew training at what was then Pinecastle Air Force Base.

He deployed to South Korea, where he served as a fighter pilot in the 428th Fighter-Bomber Squadron, flying twenty-five combat missions during the Korean War. In March 1954, he was assigned to the 517th Strategic Fighter Wing at the Malmstrom Air Force Base in Montana. He was then reassigned on base to the 407th Strategic Fighter Wing as a pilot and wing maintenance control officer. He also performed two periods of temporary duty, with the Far East Air Force and in Alaska.

After graduating from the Air Force Institute of Technology in 1959, Driessnack remained at Wright-Patterson to work as a research and development staff officer on the Douglas C-133 Cargomaster and Lockheed C-141 Starlifter programs. He entered the Air Command and Staff College in September 1962. In July 1963, he was transferred to the headquarters of the Air Force Systems Command at Andrews Air Force Base in Maryland. He was assigned to the Office of the Deputy Chief of Staff, Comptroller, as an R&D officer in the Management Systems Development Division.

Driessnack graduated from the Naval War College in 1970 and returned to the Office of the Deputy Chief of Staff, Comptroller at the Air Force Systems Command as the director of cost analysis. He served as the comptroller for the Aeronautical Systems Division at Wright-Patterson Air Force Base from 1972 to August 1974. He was then named the Deputy Chief of Staff, Comptroller at the Air Force Systems Command. In May 1976, he was promoted to deputy chief of staff, procurement and production. In August 1978, he was appointed as the comptroller of the Air Force. In July 1981, he was appointed as the assistant vice chief of staff at the headquarters of the U.S. Air Force in the Pentagon.
