= Marion L. Boswell =

United States Air Force general

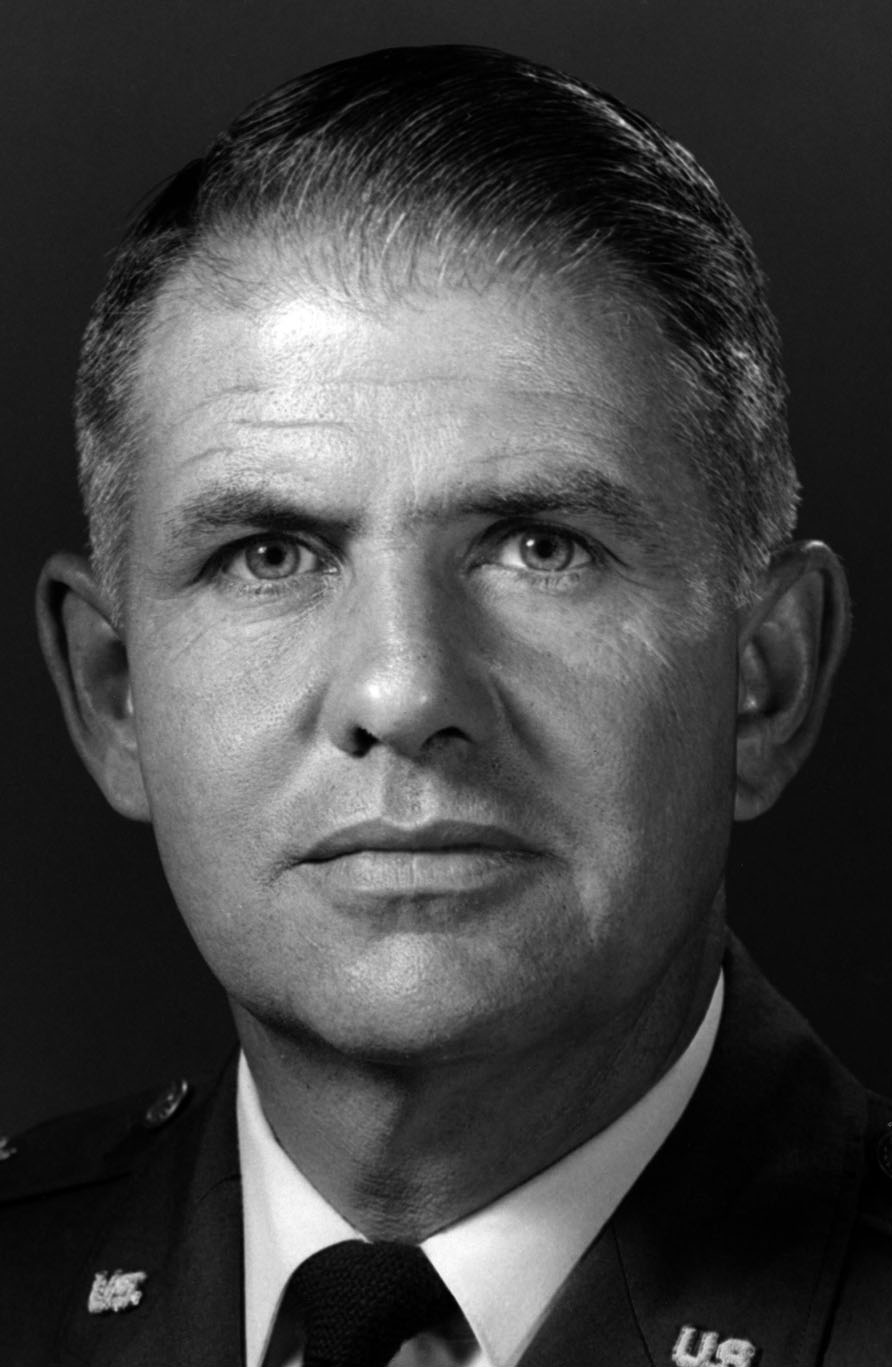
- Born: October 1, 1923; Louisville, Kentucky, US
- Died: June 9, 2002 (aged 78); Falls Church, Virginia, US
- Burial place: Arlington National Cemetery
- Military career
- Allegiance: United States
- Branch: United States Air Force
- Service years: 1943–1981
- Rank: Lieutenant General
- Nickname: Boz
- Commands: Assistant Vice Chief of Staff, Headquarters U.S. Air Force
- Awards: Distinguished Service Medal with two oak leaf clusters, Legion of Merit with oak leaf cluster, Distinguished Flying Cross with oak leaf cluster, Meritorious Service Medal, Air Medal with 19 oak leaf clusters, Joint Service Commendation Medal, Air Force Commendation Medal with oak leaf cluster, Air Force Outstanding Unit Award ribbon with two oak leaf clusters and "V" device, and Republic of Vietnam Gallantry Cross with palm and gold star

Marion L. Boswell (October 1, 1923 – June 9, 2002) was an American Air Force lieutenant general who was assistant vice chief of staff, Headquarters U.S. Air Force, Washington, D.C., and also served as chairman and senior Air Force representative, United States Delegation to the Military Staff Committee, United Nations.

== Life and career ==
Boswell was born in Louisville, Kentucky. He began active military duty in February 1943, during World War II, as an aviation cadet and received his commission as a second lieutenant in the U.S. Army Air Corps and his pilot wings in February 1944. In July 1944 he was assigned to the 398th Bombardment Group, Eighth Air Force, in the European theater of operations, where he flew 35 combat missions in B- 17 s. He returned to the United States in March 1945 and was assigned to Pursuit Flight, 6th Ferry Group, Long Beach, California.

From 1947 to 1951, Boswell was assigned to Strategic Air Command's 301st Bombardment Wing at Smoky Hill Air Force Base, Kan., and later at Barksdale Air Force Base, Louisiana, where he served as a B-29 aircraft commander, instructor and standardization pilot. In February 1951 he became pilot and aide for General J.H. "Hamp" Atkinson, commander, Second Air Force at Barksdale Air Force Base, and went to Elmendorf Air Force Base, Alaska, in 1952 with the general, who became commander in chief, Alaskan Air Command. From September 1955 to September 1958, he was operations officer and assistant deputy commander for operations, 384th Bombardment Wing at Little Rock Air Force Base, Ark.

He was assigned to duty in October 1958 with the commandant of cadets, U.S. Air Force Academy, Colorado, as group air officer commanding, Cadet Wing, and director of military studies. In July 1961 he became deputy commander for operations, 97th Bombardment Wing, Blytheville Air Force Base, Ark. It was during this period that the wing, flying B-52 bomber and KC-135 tanker aircraft, was cited for its airborne alert operations during the Cuban crisis and subsequently presented with the Air Force Outstanding Unit Award.

In October 1963 Boswell was assigned to Headquarters U.S. Air Force, Personnel Plans and Policy Directorate, Office of the Deputy Chief of Staff, Personnel, Washington, D.C. He entered the National War College, Fort Lesley J. McNair, Washington, D.C., in August 1965. In September 1966, after transition training in F-105s, he returned to duty with the tactical forces as deputy commander for operations, 49th Tactical Fighter Wing, Spangdahlem Air Base, Germany, where he flew F-4s and F-105s.

In February 1968 he went to Southeast Asia as vice commander of the 366th Tactical Fighter Wing at Da Nang Air Base, Republic of Vietnam. He flew 190 combat missions in F-4D's. Eighty of these missions were against targets in North Vietnam.

He returned to the United States and in June 1969 assumed command of the 4th Tactical Fighter Wing, Seymour Johnson Air Force Base, North Carolina. During his command the wing, famous for its aerial victories during World War II and the Korean War, continued to uphold its motto "Fourth But First" in testing and proving the Air Force's new "bare base" tactical mobility concept.

Boswell was assigned to the Office of the Secretary of the Air Force in Washington, D.C., as deputy director of legislative liaison in June 1970 and became director in May 1973. In August 1974 he was named assistant vice chief of staff, U.S. Air Force, with additional duty as senior Air Force member, Military Staff Committee, United Nations.

He became commander of the Alaskan Air Command and the Alaskan North American Air Defense Region in October 1976 and served in these positions until July 1978 when he became chief of staff, Pacific Command. He assumed his present duties in June 1979.

Boswell is a command pilot with 8,000 hours of flying time, of which 500 are combat hours. He is experienced in 21 military aircraft, including F-4s, F-105s and B-52s.

He was promoted to lieutenant general August 1, 1974, with date of rank July 31, 1974. He retired on July 1, 1981. He died of congestive heart failure in 2002. He is buried with his wife Sally (1927–2008) at Arlington National Cemetery.
