= Stayce Harris =

US Air Force general

Stayce D. Harris
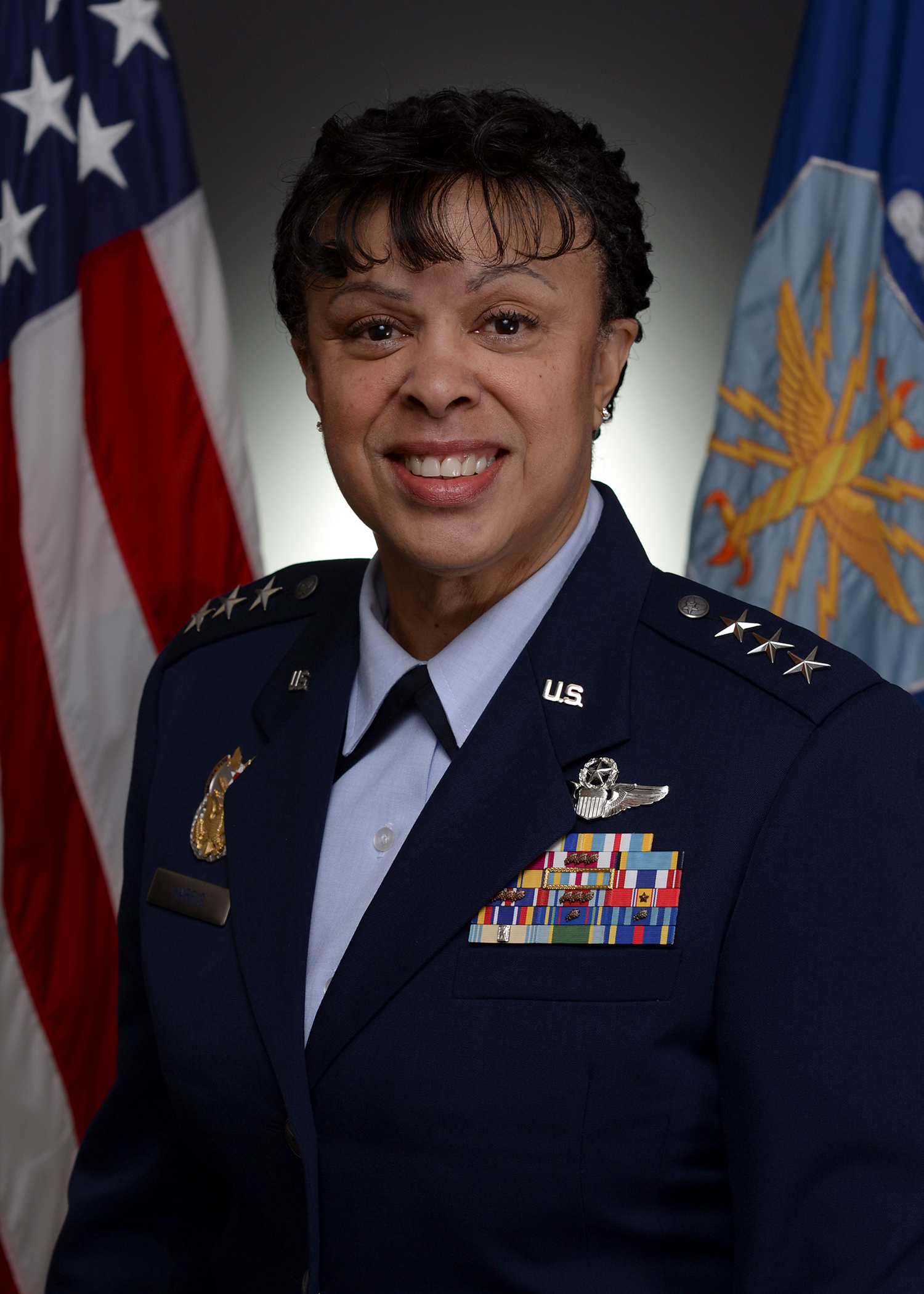
- Official U.S. Air Force Photo
- Born: 1959 (age 66–67); Los Angeles, California, US
- Military career
- Allegiance: United States of America
- Branch: United States Air Force
- Service years: 1982–2019
- Rank: Lieutenant General
- Commands: Twenty-Second Air Force; 459th Air Refueling Wing; 494th Air Expeditionary Group; 729th Airlift Squadron
- Awards: Air Force Distinguished Service Medal (2); Defense Superior Service Medal; Legion of Merit; Meritorious Service Medal; Aerial Achievement Medal; Air Force Commendation Medal

Stayce D. Harris (born 1959) is a retired United States Air Force Lieutenant General who last served as the Inspector General of the Air Force. Harris previously served as the Assistant Vice Chief of Staff and Director, Air Staff, Headquarters, United States Air Force. She also served as Deputy Chairman of the Air Force Council, and was the Air Force accreditation official for the international Corps of Air Attachés. Harris' promotion to Lieutenant General was a first for African-American females, as she is the first to hold the three-star rank in the U.S. Air Force. Additionally, she is the first Air Force Reservist to be promoted to the three-star rank other than the Commander, Air Force Reserve Command. Prior to her assignment as Assistant Vice Chief of Staff, Harris was Commander, Twenty-Second Air Force.

Harris received her commission in 1981 through Air Force ROTC at the University of Southern California serving on active duty until transferring to the Air Force Reserve in 1991. While in the reserves Harris has served as in Individual Mobilization Augmentee in multiple staff assignments. She has also commanded the 459th Air Refueling Wing, 494th Air Expeditionary Group, and 729th Airlift Squadron. Harris is a Command Pilot having flown more than 2,500 hours in military aircraft. Those aircraft include the C-130H, KC-135R, C-141B/C, T-38, and T-37. She received a BS in industrial and systems engineering from the University of Southern California and a master of aviation management from Embry-Riddle Aeronautical University.

== Awards and decorations ==
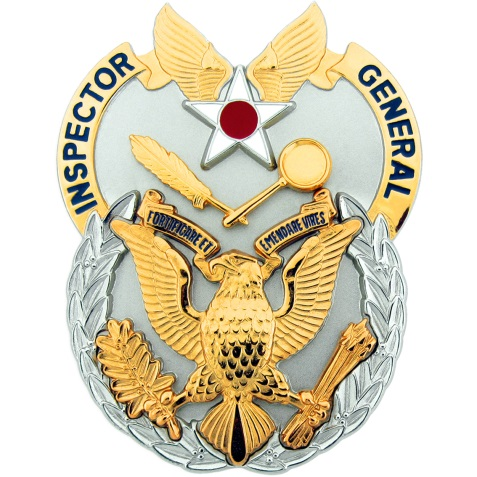
US Air Force Command Pilot Badge
Inspector General of the Air Force Badge

Air Force Distinguished Service Medal with one bronze oak leaf cluster
Defense Superior Service Medal
Legion of Merit
Meritorious Service Medal with three oak leaf clusters
Aerial Achievement Medal
Air Force Commendation Medal
Joint Meritorious Unit Award
Meritorious Unit Award
Air Force Outstanding Unit Award with three oak leaf clusters
Combat Readiness Medal with three oak leaf cluster
National Defense Service Medal with bronze star
Global War on Terrorism Service Medal
Nuclear Deterrence Operations Service Medal with oak leaf cluster
Air Force Longevity Service Award with silver oak leaf cluster
Armed Forces Reserve Medal with silver hourglass
Small Arms Expert Marksmanship Ribbon
Air Force Training Ribbon

== Professional memberships and associations ==
- Air Force Association
- Reserve Officers Association
- Airlift/Tanker Association
- Air Force Sergeants Association
- Tuskegee Airmen Inc.
- Women Military Aviators
- American Legion

== Dates of promotion ==
- Second Lieutenant February 13, 1982
- First Lieutenant February 13, 1984
- Captain February 13, 1986
- Major March 5, 1993
- Lieutenant Colonel September 18, 1998
- Colonel April 1, 2002
- Brigadier General April 2, 2009
- Major General December 20, 2013
- Lieutenant General August 19, 2016

== See also ==
- List of female United States military generals and flag officers

Military offices
Preceded by John W. Hesterman III	Assistant Vice Chief of Staff of the United States Air Force; 2016–2017	Succeeded by Jacqueline Van Ovost
Preceded by Anthony J. Rock	Inspector General of the United States Air Force; 2017–2019	Succeeded by Sami D. Said
