= John Wilson Carpenter III =

United States Air Force general

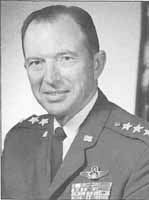
- Lt. General John W. Carpenter III
- Born: August 11, 1916; Starkville, Mississippi
- Died: November 8, 1996 (aged 80); San Antonio, Texas
- Military career
- Allegiance: United States of America
- Branch: United States Army; United States Air Force
- Rank: Lieutenant general
- Units: 19th Operations Group; 19th Bombardment Group; Headquarters Army Air Forces Bombardment Training Division; Headquarters Twentieth Air Force in Washington and the Mariana Islands; Air Command and Staff College
- Commands: 5th Reconnaissance Group; Vice Commander, Thirteenth Air Force; Air Research and Development Command (now Air Force Systems Command); Vice Commander of Arnold Engineering Development Center; Air Research and Development Command; Air Force Flight Test Center at Edwards Air Force Base, California; Air University; USAF Deputy Chief of Staff, Personnel; USAF Vice Chief of Staff
- Conflicts: World War II; Philippine Islands; Bataan; Netherlands East Indies; Battle of the Coral Sea; Papua New Guinea; Rabaul, New Britain

John Wilson Carpenter III (August 11, 1916 – November 8, 1996) was a 1939 graduate of the U.S. Military Academy who served with distinction in the U.S. Air Force as a pilot and commander, including significant combat service.

== Education ==
Carpenter studied engineering at Oklahoma A&M University and Mississippi State College before entering the U.S. Military Academy at West Point, New York, in 1935, where he graduated with a Bachelor of Science degree in military science in 1939. After graduation, he attended the U.S. Army Air Corps flying schools at Tulsa, Oklahoma, Randolph Field, Texas and Kelly Field, Texas, receiving his pilot wings in June 1940.

== Military career ==
Carpenter's first flying assignment was with the 19th Bombardment Group at March Air Force Base, California, where he served as a heavy bombardment pilot, navigator and bombardier. In May 1941 he participated in the first mass flight of B-17s from Hamilton Field, California, to Hickam Air Force Base, Hawaii. In October 1941 he flew with the 19th Bombardment Group as navigator on a B-17 from Albuquerque, New Mexico, to Clark Field, the Philippine Islands, where he was assigned as squadron intelligence officer and combat crew commander.

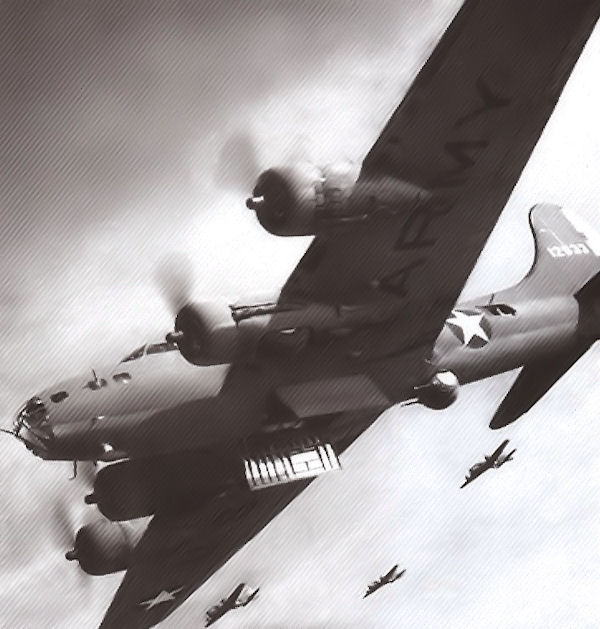
B-17s of the 19th Bombardment Group attacking Japanese-held Lae Airfield, New Guinea on 26–27 June 1942. Boeing B-17E Fortress 41-2633 (Sally) in Foreground. This aircraft was damaged by a storm in April 1945. Afterwards it was flown to Brisbane, Australia for scrapping in May 1945

=== Combat 1941-1942 ===
When the Japanese attacked Clark Field on December 8, 1941, then-Lieutenant Carpenter was airborne on a reconnaissance mission. His aircraft survived several passes made by 5-10 Japanese fighter aircraft and he then maneuvered to avoid contact until the attack on the field ended. His aircraft was one of the first to land at Clark Field after the attack. The following day he flew the first reconnaissance mission to Formosa (now Taiwan), in place of the B-17 destroyed in the previous day's attack while by while being prepared for the same mission. He was forced to abort the mission due to generator problems. After flying several missions against the Japanese forces, he was ordered to Bataan, where he commanded the ground echelon of the 19th Bombardment Group. After serving with the Infantry for two months he was evacuated to Java by submarine and rejoined his unit. He continued to fly combat missions until the 19th Bombardment Group returned to the United States in December 1942.

=== Post-combat 1943-1944 ===
Command Pilot Badge, WWII Army design and currently Air Force regulation

After returning to the continental U.S., Carpenter served on tours of duty at Eglin Air Force Base, Florida; Headquarters Army Air Forces Bombardment Training Division, Washington, D.C.; and Headquarters Twentieth Air Force in Washington and the Mariana Islands.

==== B-29s ====
The new B-29 Superfortress had serious teething problems and General Arnold became alarmed at the situation and directed that his assistant, Major General B. E. Meyer, personally take charge of the entire modification program. The resulting burst of activity that took place between 10 March and 15 April 1944 came to be known as the "Battle of Kansas." Carpenter, with many others, played an important part in getting the B-29s ready for combat duties.

==== Twentieth Air Force ====
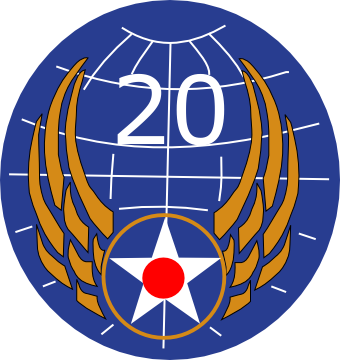

The Twentieth Air Force was brought into existence on 4 April 1944 specifically to perform strategic bombardment missions against Japan. This was done at the insistence of General Henry H. (Hap) Arnold, commander of the USAAF, mainly to avoid having the new B-29 Superfortress being diverted to tactical missions under pressure from the China Burma India Theater commanders. Twentieth Air Force was to be commanded by General Arnold himself at Joint Chiefs of Staff level. Carpenter had been involved in the training division for the B-29s then assigned to the Headquarters of the Twentieth Air Force in Washington. The Twentieth Air Force was completely autonomous and its B-29s were to be completely independent of other command structures and would be dedicated exclusively against strategic targets in Japan.

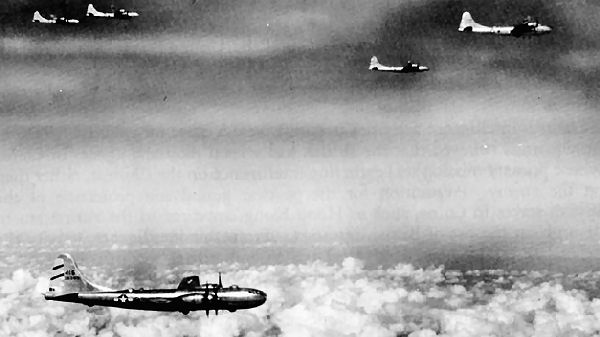
B-29s of the 58th Bomb Wing on a mission to Rangood, Burma, 1944

In addition Twentieth Air Force was chosen (secretly) to be the operational component of the Manhattan Project in 1944, and performed the atomic attacks on Japan in August 1945. In 1944, one of Carpenter's duties was to help oversee the personnel selected for the 509th Composite Group and to support the independence of this unit.

Initially under the command of General Hap Arnold, and later under operational command of General Curtis LeMay and General Nathan Twining. In August 1945 the Twentieth Air Force was placed under the U.S. Strategic Air Forces in the Pacific which was commanded by General Carl Spaatz.

==== Operation Matterhorn ====
Operation Matterhorn was the name for the Twentieth Air Force B-29 Superfortress offensive against the Empire of Japan from airfields in China. On 10 April 1944, the Joint Chiefs of Staff (JCS) informally approved Operation Matterhorn. The operational vehicle was to be the 58th Bombardment Wing (Very Heavy) of the XX Bomber Command.

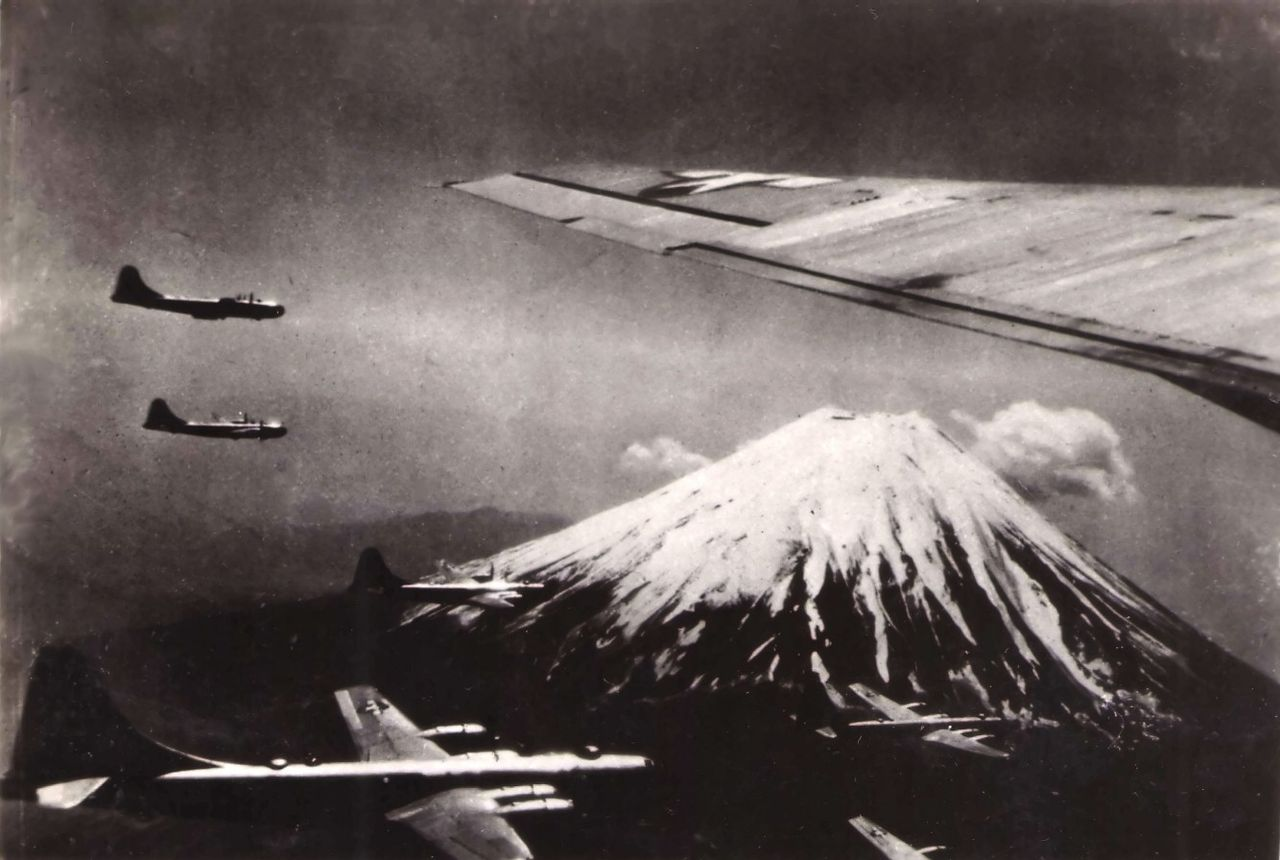
Twentieth Bomb Wing B-29s flying near Mount Fuji, Japan, 1945

By late 1944, it was becoming apparent that B-29 operations against Japan staged out of bases in China and India were far too expensive in men and materials and would have to be stopped. In December 1944, the Joint Chiefs of Staff made the decision that Operation Matterhorn would be phased out, and the 58th Bombardment Wing's B-29s would be moved to newly captured bases in the Marianas in the central Pacific. Carpenter moved there to help expedite the Twentieth Air Force mission and to help prepare for the movement of the 509th there.

The Marianas chain of islands, consisting primarily of Saipan, Tinian, and Guam, were considered as being ideal bases from which to launch B-29 operations against Japan. The islands were about 1500 miles from Tokyo, a range which the B-29s could just about manage. Most important of all, they could be put on a direct supply line from the United States by ship.

=== Post war ===
Later tours included Air Command and Staff College as a student and then instructor, a tour in the Philippine Islands, first as commander, 5th Reconnaissance Group, and later as vice commander, Thirteenth Air Force. In 1951 he was transferred to headquarters of Air Research and Development Command (now Air Force Systems Command), Baltimore, Maryland. After completing Air War College in July 1954, he became vice commander of Arnold Engineering Development Center at Arnold Air Force Base (Station, at the time), Tullahoma, Tennessee. He returned to Air Research and Development Command headquarters in March 1955 and later became chief of plans and programs. In March 1959 he assumed command of the Air Force Flight Test Center at Edwards Air Force Base, California. In July 1961 he was assigned to Headquarters U.S. Air Force, Washington, D.C. In August 1965 he was appointed commander of Air University, where he served until July 1968 when he returned to Headquarters U.S. Air Force as Deputy Chief of Staff, Personnel. In August 1969 he was appointed assistant Vice Chief of Staff, U.S. Air Force, with additional duty as senior Air Force member, Military Staff Committee, United Nations, in which positions he completed his active duty military service.

=== Retirement from active duty ===
Carpenter retired in the rank of lieutenant general on August 1, 1970. In retirement, he served as the eighth superintendent of Culver Military Academy from 1970 to 1974.

== Military ranks ==
	O-1	O-2	O-3	O-4	O-5	O-6	O-7	O-8	O-9
Insignia
Title	Second lieutenant	First lieutenant	Captain	Major	Lieutenant colonel	Colonel	Brigadier general	Major general	Lieutenant general
Date of rank	1939

== Decorations ==
Carpenter's military decorations include the Air Force Distinguished Service Medal with one oak leaf cluster, the Silver Star with two oak leaf clusters, the Legion of Merit with two oak leaf clusters, Distinguished Flying Cross with two oak leaf clusters and the Air Medal with oak leaf cluster. He was also awarded World War II service medals.

- Air Force Distinguished Service Medal with one oak leaf cluster.
- Silver Star with two oak leaf clusters.
- Legion of Merit with two oak leaf clusters.
- Distinguished Flying Cross with two oak leaf clusters.
- Air Medal with oak leaf cluster.
- American Defense Service Medal
- American Campaign Medal
- Asiatic-Pacific Campaign Medal
- World War II Victory Medal

== See also ==
- West Point Memorial Page to Lt. Gen. John W. Carpenter III.
