= Air and Space Expeditionary Service Ribbon =

- formerly Air Force Expeditionary Service Ribbon
- Air Force Expeditionary Service Ribbon
- Type: Service ribbon
- Presented by: the Department of the Air Force
- Status: Current
- Established: 2003
- ribbon with frame

Precedence
- Next (higher): Air and Space Overseas Long Tour Service Ribbon
- Equivalent: Naval Service: Navy Sea Service Deployment Ribbon
- Next (lower): Air and Space Longevity Service Award
- Related: Navy Expeditionary Medal; Marine Corps Expeditionary Medal

The Air and Space Expeditionary Service Ribbon previously known as the Air Force Expeditionary Service Ribbon (AFESR) is a military award of the United States Air Force and United States Space Force which was first created in June 2003 as the Air Force Expeditionary Service Ribbon. The ribbon is awarded to any member of the Air Force or Space Force who completes a standard contingency deployment. On 16 November 2020, the Air Force Expeditionary Service Ribbon was renamed to the Air and Space Expeditionary Service Ribbon by the Secretary of the Air Force.

The regulations of the Air and Space Expeditionary Service Ribbon define a deployment as either forty-five consecutive days or ninety non-consecutive days in a deployed status. Temporary duty orders also qualify towards the ninety-day time requirement. For deployments exceeding 45–90 days, a single Air and Space Expeditionary Service Ribbon will be awarded for the entire time frame rather than issuing multiple awards for the same period of deployed service.

== Gold frame ==
Similar to the US Army's Combat Service Identification Badge (CSIB), for those service members who serve in designated combat zones and participate in combat operations, a gold frame, which the Air Force and Space Force refers to as a gold border, may be attached to the basic ribbon. It can also be awarded to those who serve in areas where the service member receives hostile fire pay and supports combat operations. The gold border is issued as a one-time award only, regardless of the number of combat operations in which a service member serves.

The Air and Space Expeditionary Service Ribbon with gold border may also be awarded to certain "over-the horizon" combat assignments, such as remotely piloted vehicle and space operators for employing a long-range weapon into a combat zone. It is therefore possible to earn the gold border geographically separated from the battlefield by thousands of miles. Such personnel, however, must have first earned the Air and Space Expeditionary Service Ribbon before the ribbon can be upgraded with a gold border.

Additional awards of the Air and Space Expeditionary Service Ribbon are denoted by oak leaf clusters and the award is retroactive to 1 October 1999.

== Symbolism ==
The center stripe is light blue and stands for Air Force and Space Force capability. From this center stripe outward on each side, the narrow white stripe stands for integrity; ultramarine blue represents worldwide deployment; Department of the Air Force yellow stands for excellence, and the last two stripes (scarlet and blue) stand for the United States.
