= James A. Jacobson =

U.S. Air Force general

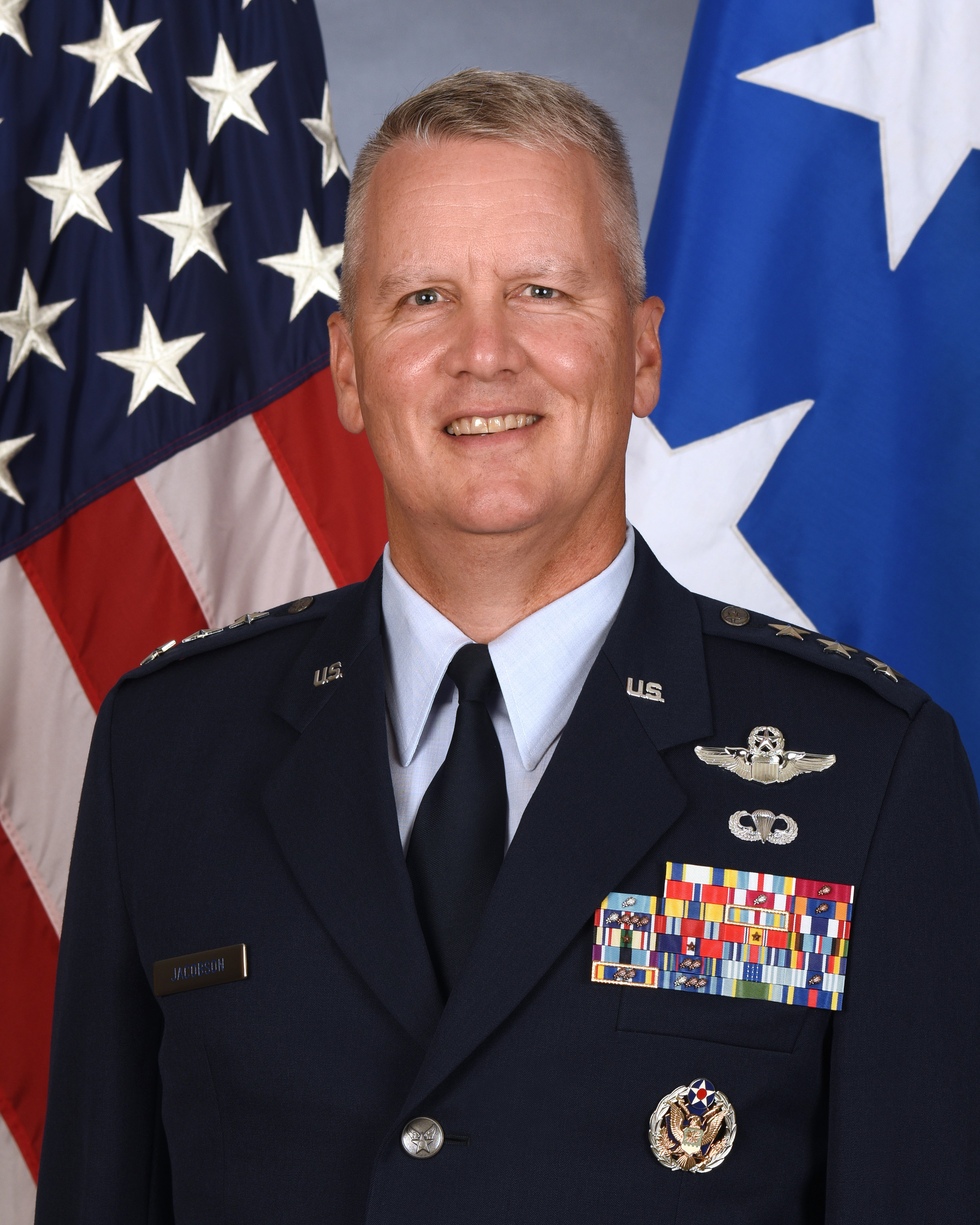
- Born: Eau Claire, Wisconsin, U.S.
- Military career
- Allegiance: United States
- Branch: United States Air Force
- Service years: 1990– present
- Rank: Lieutenant General
- Commands: Air Force District of Washington; 376th Air Expeditionary Wing; 573rd Global Support Squadron
- Awards: Air Force Distinguished Service Medal; Defense Superior Service Medal; Legion of Merit (2) Bronze Star Medal; Aerial Achievement Medal with silver oak leaf cluster Air Force Commendation Medal

James A. Jacobson is a United States Air Force lieutenant general who last served as the deputy commander of the Pacific Air Forces from 2021 He most recently served as the director of training and readiness of the U.S. Air Force. Previously, he was the commander of the Air Force District of Washington.

In July 2021, he was nominated and confirmed for promotion to lieutenant general and assigned as deputy commander of the Pacific Air Forces. His promotion became effective on August 20, 2021.

== Effective dates of promotions ==
Rank	Date
Second Lieutenant	May 30, 1990
First Lieutenant	May 30, 1992
Captain	May 30, 1994
Major	June 1, 2001
Lieutenant Colonel	May 1, 2005
Colonel	October 1, 2008
Brigadier General	June 5, 2015
Major General	July 13, 2018
Lieutenant General	Aug 20, 2021

Military offices
Preceded by ???	Commander of the 376th Air Expeditionary Wing; 2011–2012	Succeeded by Corey Martin
Preceded by Scott F. Smith	Inspector General of the Air Mobility Command; 2015–2017	Succeeded by Douglas K. Lamberth
Preceded by Darryl W. Burke	Commander of the Air Force District of Washington; 2017–2019	Succeeded by Ricky Rupp
Preceded by Scott F. Smith	Director of Training and Readiness of the United States Air Force; 2019–2021	Succeeded by Albert G. Miller
Preceded by Jon T. Thomas	Deputy Commander of the Pacific Air Forces; 2021–2024	Succeeded by Laura Lenderman
