= 326th Division =

326th Division may refer to:

- 326th Infantry Division, Wehrmacht, Germany
- 326th Heavy Bomber Aviation Division, Russia/Soviet Union
- 326th Rifle Division, Soviet Union
- 326th Air Division, United States

== See also ==
- List of military divisions by number
