= Brian S. Robinson =

U.S. Air Force general officer

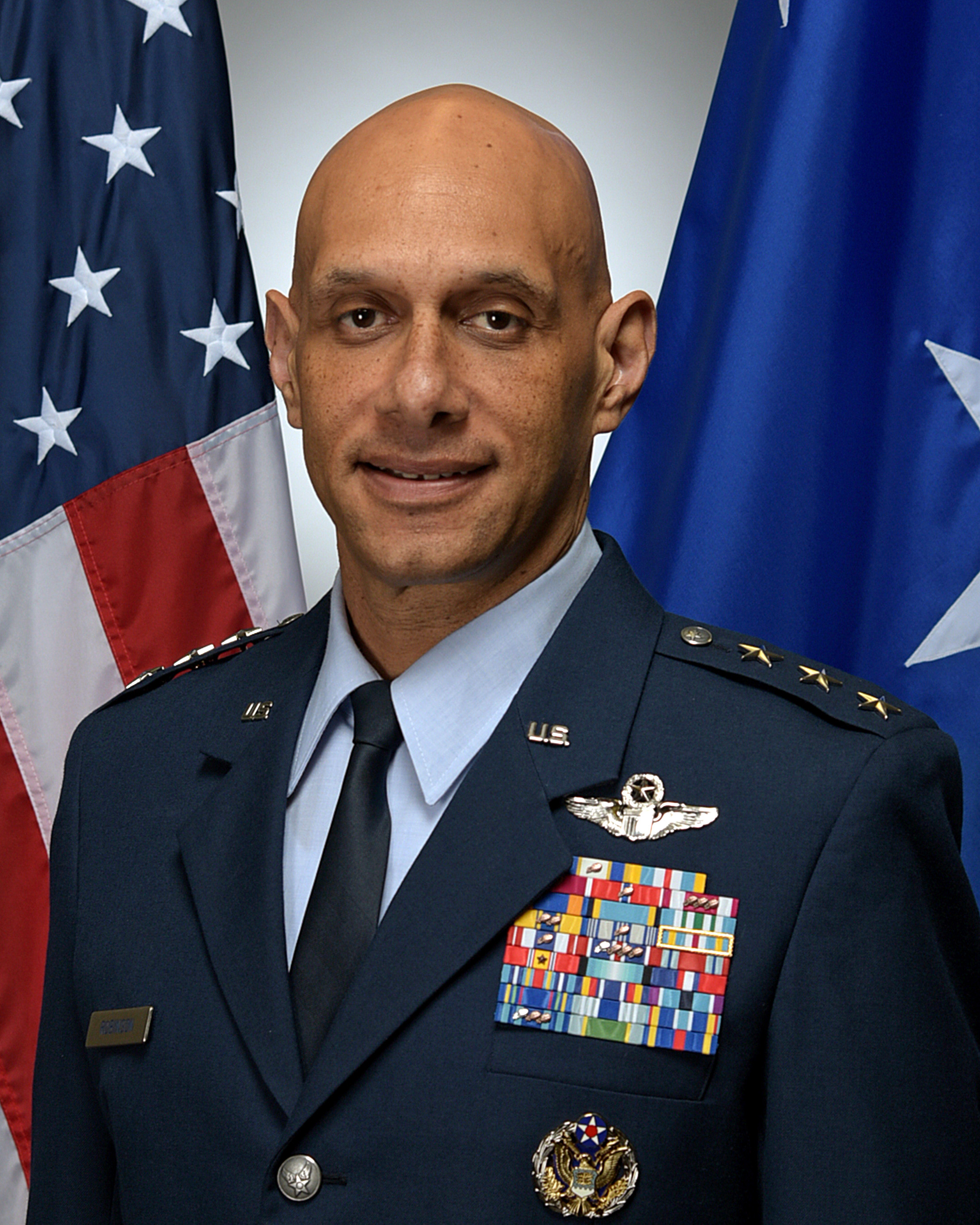
- Official portrait, 2020
- Born: 7 December 1965 (age 60); Philadelphia, Pennsylvania, U.S.
- Military career
- Allegiance: United States
- Branch: United States Air Force
- Service years: 1987–2025
- Rank: Lieutenant General
- Nickname: Smokey
- Commands: Air Education and Training Command; 618th Air Operations Center; 19th Airlift Wing; 10th Airlift Squadron
- Awards: Air Force Distinguished Service Medal (2); Defense Superior Service Medal; Legion of Merit (2); Bronze Star Medal (2)

Brian Scott Robinson (born 7 December 1965) is a retired United States Air Force lieutenant general who has served as commander of the Air Education and Training Command from 2022 to 2025. He previously served as the deputy commander of the Air Mobility Command.

Robinson was born in 1965 and raised in Philadelphia, Pennsylvania; his father, William served in the United States Army. He attended the Philadelphia High School of Engineering and Philadelphia University, earning a Bachelor's degree in computer science in 1987.

In July 2020, the United States Senate confirmed his promotion to lieutenant general and nomination to become the deputy commander of Air Mobility Command, replacing Lieutenant General Jacqueline Van Ovost, who was set to become commander of the major command.

== Awards and decorations ==
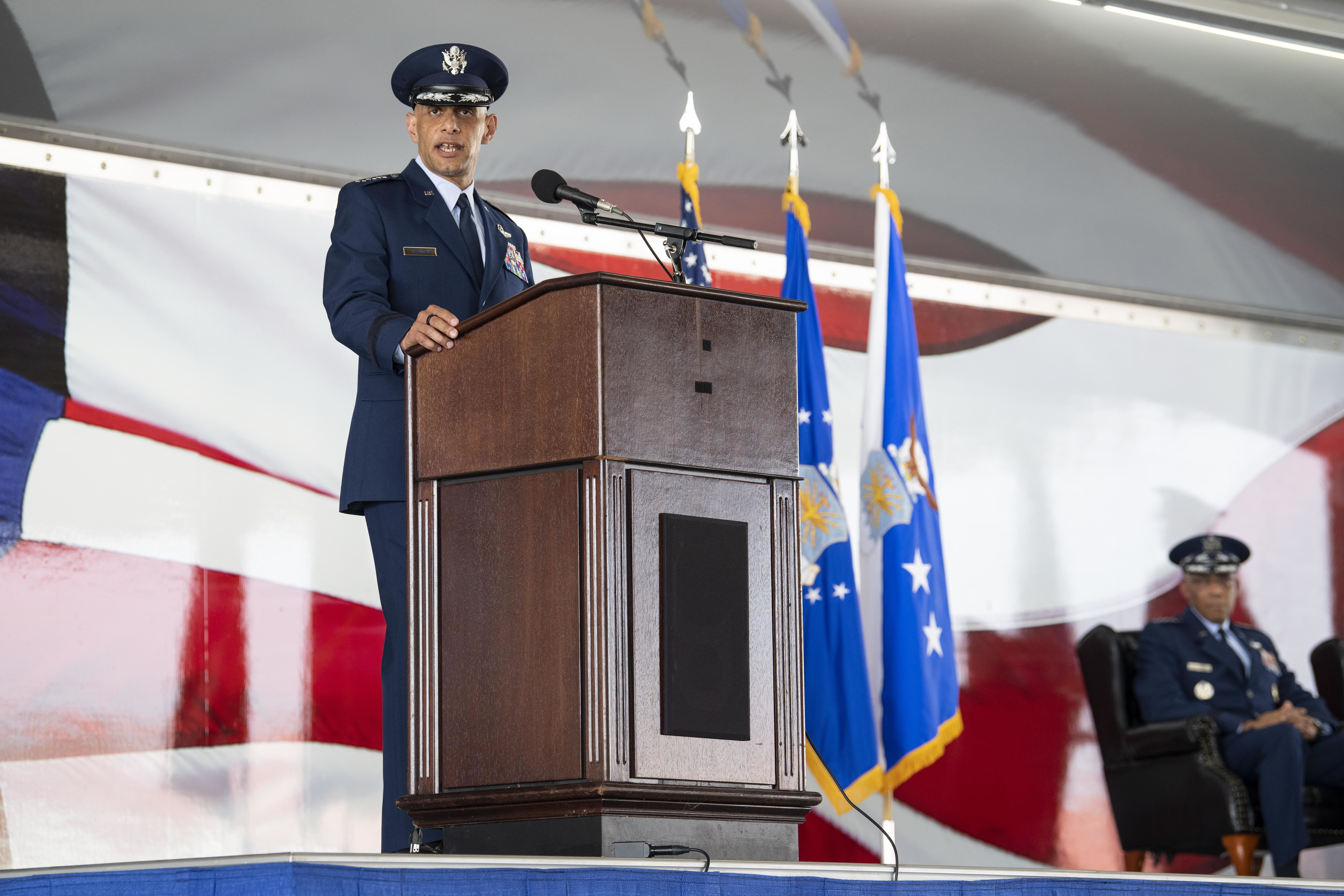
Robinson speaks at the 2022 AETC change of command ceremony on 20 May

US Air Force Command Pilot Badge
Headquarters Air Force Badge

Air Force Distinguished Service Medal with one bronze oak leaf cluster
Defense Superior Service Medal
Legion of Merit with oak leaf cluster
Bronze Star Medal with oak leaf cluster
Meritorious Service Medal with three oak leaf clusters
Air Medal
Aerial Achievement Medal
Joint Service Commendation Medal
Air Force Commendation Medal with two oak leaf clusters
Air Force Achievement Medal with oak leaf cluster
Joint Meritorious Unit Award
Air Force Meritorious Unit Award with oak leaf cluster
Air Force Outstanding Unit Award with silver and three bronze oak leaf clusters
Combat Readiness Medal
National Defense Service Medal with one bronze service star
Antarctica Service Medal
Kosovo Campaign Medal
Global War on Terrorism Expeditionary Medal
Global War on Terrorism Service Medal
Humanitarian Service Medal
Nuclear Deterrence Operations Service Medal
Air Force Overseas Long Tour Service Ribbon
Air Force Expeditionary Service Ribbon
Air Force Longevity Service Award with silver and two bronze oak leaf clusters
Small Arms Expert Marksmanship Ribbon
Air Force Training Ribbon

== Effective dates of promotions ==
Rank	Date
Second Lieutenant	15 December 1987
First Lieutenant	15 December 1989
Captain	15 December 1991
Major	1 July 1999
Lieutenant Colonel	1 March 2004
Colonel	1 June 2009
Brigadier General	2 March 2014
Major General	17 November 2017
Lieutenant General	14 August 2020

Military offices
Preceded by Michael Minihan	Commander of the 89th Airlift Wing; 2012–2013	Succeeded by Patrick Rhatigan
Preceded by ???	Vice Commander of the 618th Air Operations Center; 2013–2015	Succeeded by Kenneth Bibb
Preceded by Timothy M. Zadalis	Commander of the 618th Air Operations Center; 2015–2016	Succeeded by Kenneth Bibb
Preceded by Jerry P. Martinez	Director of Operations of the Air Mobility Command; 2016–2017	Succeeded by Sam C. Barrett
Preceded by Scott A. Vander Hamm	Assistant Deputy Chief of Staff for Operations of the United States Air Force; 2017–2019	Succeeded by Russell L. Mack
Preceded by Ricky Rupp	Director of Operations of the United States Transportation Command; 2019–2020	Succeeded by Corey Martin
Preceded by Jacqueline Van Ovost	Deputy Commander of the Air Mobility Command; 2020–2022	Succeeded by Randall Reed
Preceded by Marshall B. Webb	Commander of the Air Education and Training Command; 2022–2025	Succeeded by Clark Quinn
