= Naval Network Warfare Command =

U.S. Navy operating force and echelon III command

United States Naval Network Warfare Command
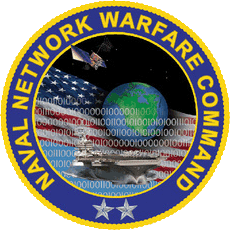
- US NETWARCOM emblem
- Founded: 2002
- Country: United States
- Branch: United States Navy
- Type: Echelon III command
- Role: Information Operations, Intelligence, Networks, Space
- Part of: Fleet Cyber Command
- Garrison/HQ: Suffolk, Virginia
- Nickname: NETWARCOM

Commanders
- Current commander: Captain J. Brettman O'Donovan

The Naval Network Warfare Command (NAVNETWARCOM) is the United States Navy's information operations, intelligence, networks, and space unit. Naval Network Warfare Command's mission is to execute, under Commander TENTH Fleet Operational Control, tactical-level command and control of Navy Networks and to leverage Joint Space Capabilities for Navy and Joint Operations.

== History ==
In 2002, some 23 organizations from several commands, including the former Naval Space Command, Naval Computer and Telecommunications Command, Fleet Information Warfare Center, and Navy Component Task Force - Computer Network Defense were brought together to form Naval Network Warfare Command, emphasizing the organization's focus on the operation and defense of the Navy's networks.

In 2005, with the disestablishment of Naval Security Group (NAVSECGRU), NETWARCOM brought the former Naval Security Group Activities (NSGAs) under its umbrella, designating them Naval Information Operation Center(s) (NIOC) and Naval Information Operation Detachment(s) (NIOD). The mission of the command fundamentally changed, making it the Navy's lead for Information Operations, as well as Networks and Space.

The assumption, alignment, and integration of Fleet Intelligence Type Commander duties, responsibilities and functions at NETWARCOM in 2008 began a measured and evolutionary process to improve integrated Fleet Intelligence and ISR readiness. This alignment provides a single Fleet champion for ISR and positions Fleet Intelligence for better and timelier support to fleet operations.

In 2009, the Secretary of Defense directed the establishment of U.S. Cyber Command. Each of the services was also directed to establish a supporting command to U.S. Cyber Command; as a result, the Naval Information Operations Centers (NIOC) were moved to the reestablished Tenth Fleet to help form U.S. Fleet Cyber Command. Naval Network Warfare Command was reorganized and its mission revised to "operate and defend the Navy's portion of the Global Information Grid and deliver reliable and secure Net-centric and space war-fighting capabilities in support of strategic, operational and tactical missions across the Navy".

The headquarters is at Navy Cyber Forces in Norfolk, Virginia.

=== Organization ===
Naval Network Warfare Command acts as Combined Task Force 1010 (network operations & defense) for Tenth Fleet

- CTF 1010 - Naval Network Warfare Command
  - CTG 1010.3 - NCTAMS PAC
  - CTG 1010.4 - NCTAMS LANT

== See also ==
- United States Tenth Fleet
- U.S. Navy Information Dominance Corps
- Naval Computer and Telecommunications Command
- Navy Information Operations Command, Hawaii
