= Naval Computer and Telecommunications Command =

Former command of the U.S. Navy (1990-2001)

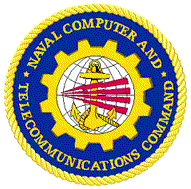
- Active: December 1990 – August 2001

The Naval Computer and Telecommunications Command (COMNAVCOMTELCOM) was a former command of the United States Navy. It was located at the intersection of Massachusetts Avenue and Nebraska Avenue within Nebraska Avenue Complex in Washington, D.C.

== Mission ==
Its mission was to organize, train, and equip computer and telecommunications activities to provide quality information systems and services to the fleet, supporting commands and higher authority to manage, process, and transfer information for command, control, and administration of the Navy.

== See also ==
- Naval Network Warfare Command
- Director, Communications Security Material System
- Naval Communications Security Material System
