= Joel D. Jackson =

U.S. Air Force general

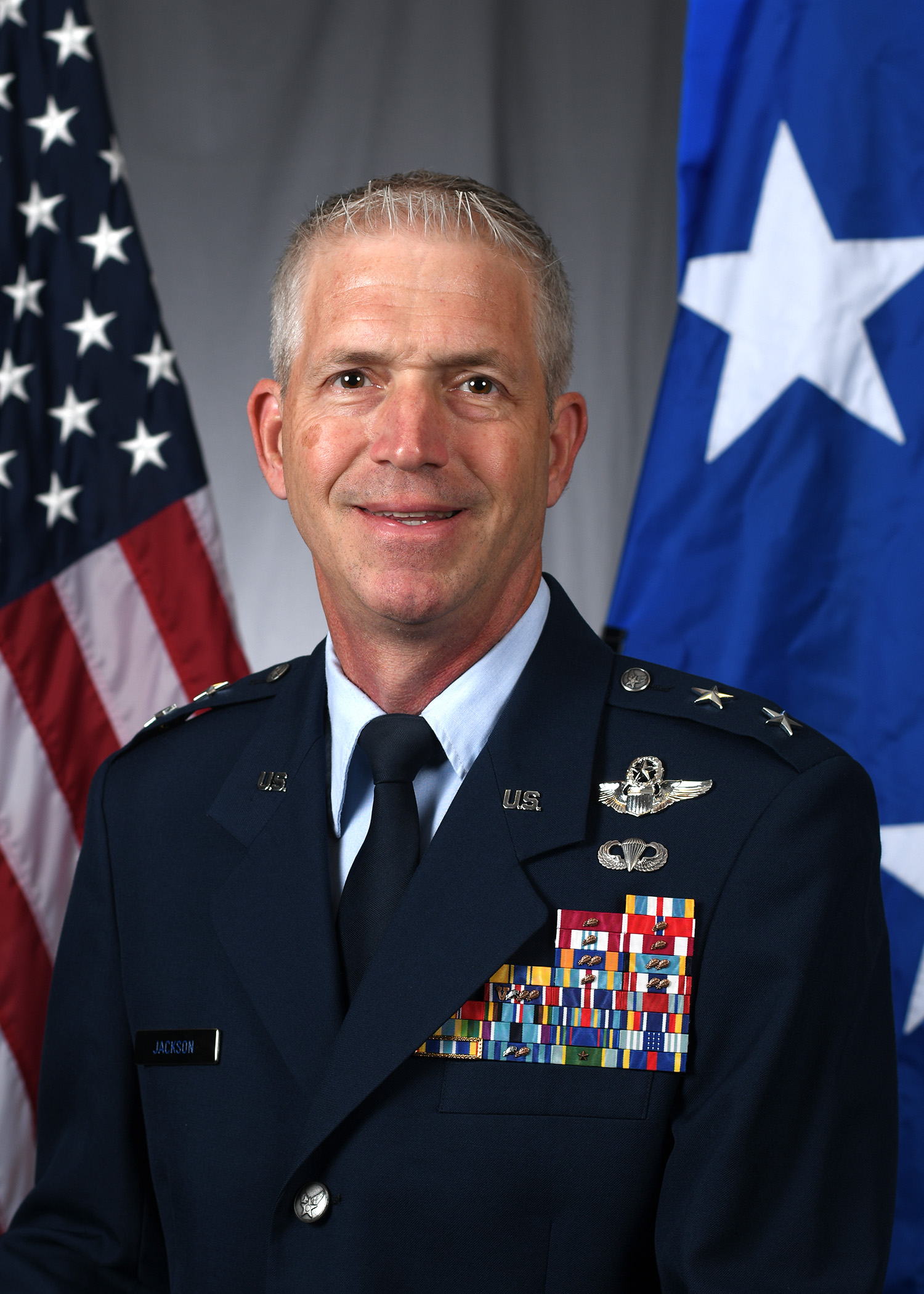
- Born: Dayton, Ohio, U.S.
- Military career
- Allegiance: United States
- Branch: United States Air Force
- Service years: 1992-2023
- Rank: Major General
- Commands: Air Force District of Washington; 320th Air Expeditionary Wing; 60th Air Mobility Wing; 22nd Air Refueling Wing; 6th Air Refueling Squadron
- Awards: Defense Superior Service Medal; Legion of Merit (2)

Joel Douglas Jackson is a retired United States Air Force major general who last served as commander of the Air Force District of Washington and 320th Air Expeditionary Wing from 2021 to 2023. He previously served as the director of operations, strategic deterrence, and nuclear integration of the Air Mobility Command.

Military offices
Preceded by Ricky Rupp	Commander of the 22nd Air Refueling Wing; 2013–2015	Succeeded by Albert G. Miller
Preceded by Corey Martin	Commander of the 60th Air Mobility Wing; 2015–2016	Succeeded by John M. Klein Jr.
Preceded by Darren V. James	Vice Commander of the Eighteenth Air Force; 2018–2019	Succeeded by Charles D. Bolton
Preceded by ???	Deputy Director of Operations, Strategic Deterrence, and Nuclear Integration of the Air Mobility Command; 2019–2020	Succeeded by Charles D. Bolton
Preceded by Corey Martin	Director of Operations, Strategic Deterrence, and Nuclear Integration of the Air Mobility Command; 2020–2021	Succeeded by Laura Lenderman
Preceded by Ricky Rupp	Commander of the Air Force District of Washington; 2021–2023	Succeeded by Daniel A. DeVoe
