= Ricky Rupp =

U.S. Air Force lieutenant general

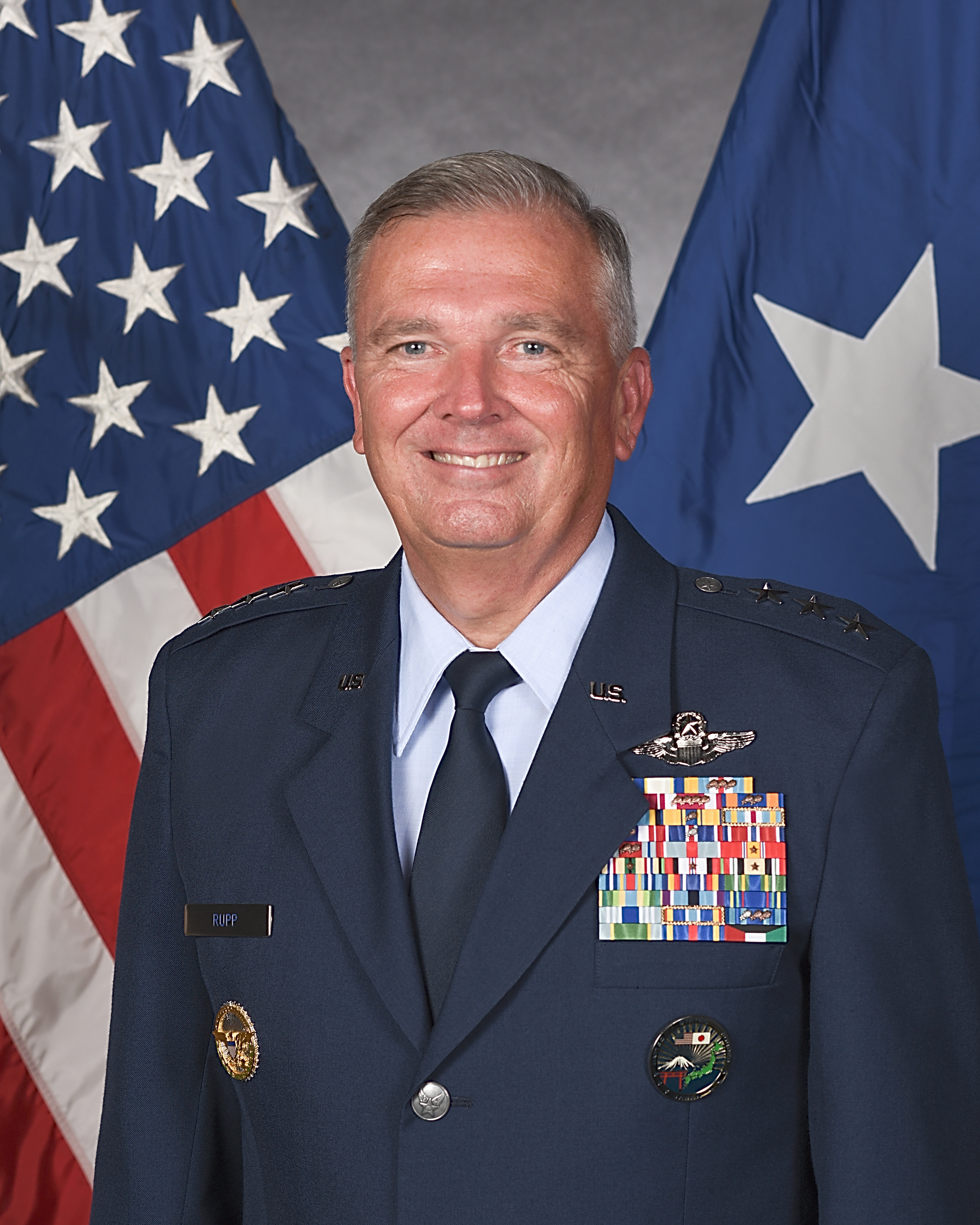
- Military career
- Allegiance: United States
- Branch: United States Air Force
- Service years: 1989–2024
- Rank: Lieutenant General
- Commands: United States Forces Japan; Fifth Air Force; Air Force District of Washington; 320th Air Expeditionary Wing; 22nd Air Refueling Wing; 14th Airlift Squadron
- Awards: Air Force Distinguished Service Medal (2); Defense Superior Service Medal (4); Legion of Merit

Ricky N. Rupp is a retired United States Air Force lieutenant general who served as the commander of United States Forces Japan and Fifth Air Force from 2021 to 2024. He previously served as commander of the Air Force District of Washington from 2019 to 2021. Previously, he was the director of operations of the United States Transportation Command from 2017 to 2019.

In July 2021, he was nominated for promotion to lieutenant general and assignment as the commander of Fifth Air Force and the United States Forces Japan, succeeding Kevin Schneider.

== Awards and decorations ==
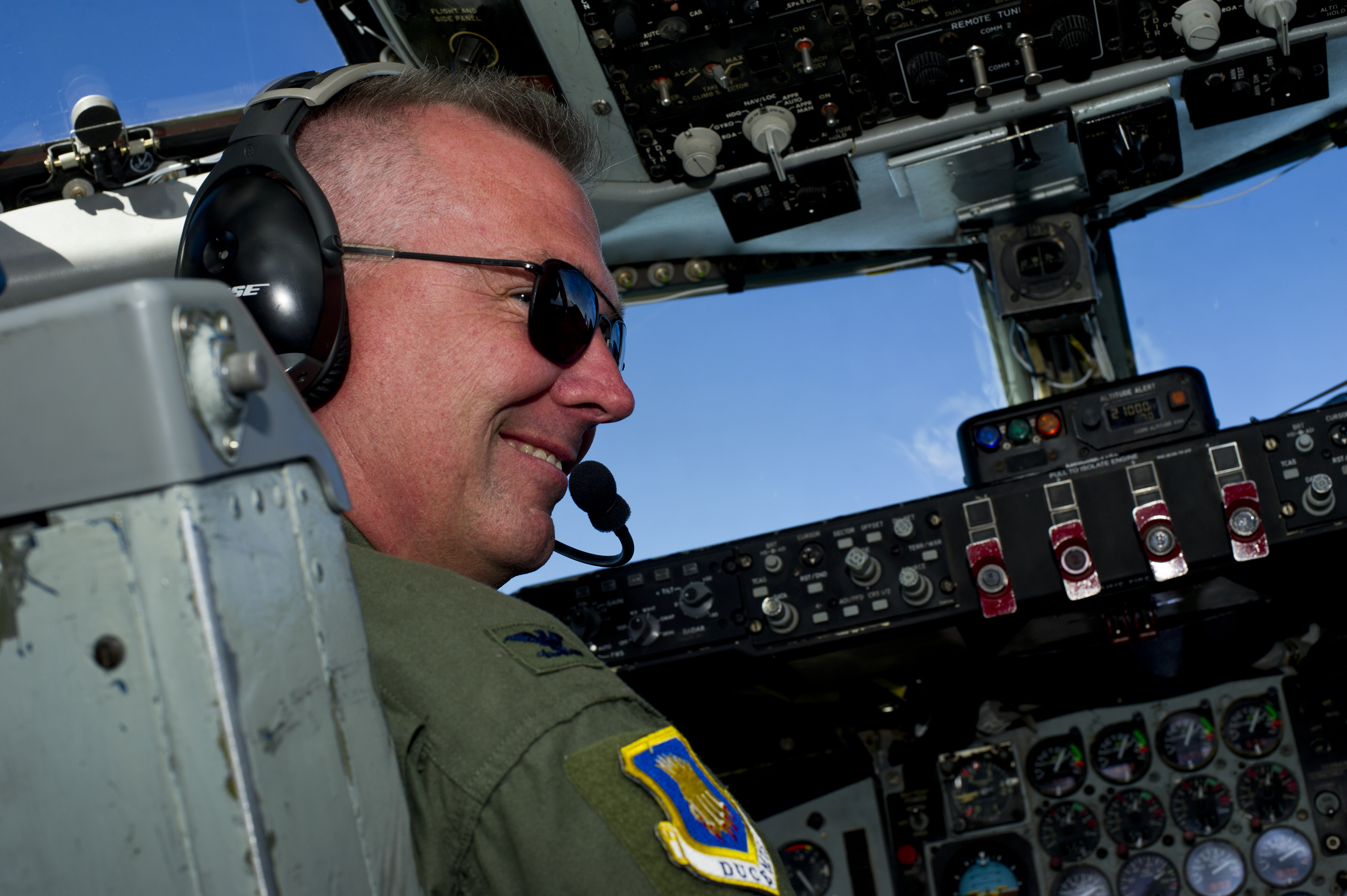
Colonel Ricky Rupp piloting a Boeing KC-135 StratoTanker on May 14, 2013.

US Air Force Command Pilot Badge
United States Forces Japan Badge
Office of the Secretary of Defense Identification Badge

Air Force Distinguished Service Medal with bronze oak leaf cluster
Defense Superior Service Medal with three oak leaf clusters
Legion of Merit
Meritorious Service Medal with four oak leaf clusters
Air Medal with two oak leaf clusters
Aerial Achievement Medal with oak leaf cluster
Air Force Commendation Medal with oak leaf cluster
Joint Meritorious Unit Award
Air Force Meritorious Unit Award with oak leaf cluster
Air Force Outstanding Unit Award with silver oak leaf cluster
Air Force Organizational Excellence Award
Combat Readiness Medal with two oak leaf clusters
Air Force Recognition Ribbon
National Defense Service Medal with one bronze service star
Southwest Asia Service Medal with service star
Afghanistan Campaign Medal with service star
Iraq Campaign Medal with service star
Global War on Terrorism Expeditionary Medal
Global War on Terrorism Service Medal
Korea Defense Service Medal
Armed Forces Service Medal
Humanitarian Service Medal
Nuclear Deterrence Operations Service Medal
Air Force Overseas Long Tour Service Ribbon
Air Force Expeditionary Service Ribbon with gold frame
Air Force Longevity Service Award with one silver and two bronze oak leaf clusters
Small Arms Expert Marksmanship Ribbon
Air Force Training Ribbon
Kuwait Liberation Medal (Kuwait)
Grand Cordon of the Order of the Rising Sun (Japan)

== Effective dates of promotions ==
Rank	Date
Second Lieutenant	May 4, 1989
First Lieutenant	May 4, 1991
Captain	May 4, 1993
Major	July 1, 2000
Lieutenant Colonel	April 1, 2004
Colonel	August 1, 2009
Brigadier General	November 7, 2014
Major General	June 2, 2018
Lieutenant General	August 27, 2021

Military offices
Preceded by Jamie Crowhurst	Commander of the 22nd Air Refueling Wing; 2011–2013	Succeeded by Joel D. Jackson
Preceded by Douglas A. Cox	Special Assistant to the Commander of the United Nations Command, ROK/US Combined Forces Command, and United States Forces Korea; 2013–2015	Succeeded by Corey Martin
Preceded by John S. Shapland	Senior Defense Official and Defense Attaché to Israel; 2015–2017	Succeeded by Corey Martin
Preceded by Giovanni K. Tuck	Director of Operations of the United States Transportation Command; 2017–2019	Succeeded by Brian S. Robinson
Preceded by James A. Jacobson	Commander of Air Force District of Washington; 2019–2021	Succeeded by Joel D. Jackson
Preceded by Kevin Schneider	Commander of United States Forces Japan and the Fifth Air Force; 2021–2024	Succeeded by Stephen Jost
