= Nebraska Avenue Complex =

American government buildings

Coordinates: 38°56′20″N 77°4′59″W

- U.S. National Register of Historic Places
- Mount Vernon Seminary for Girls
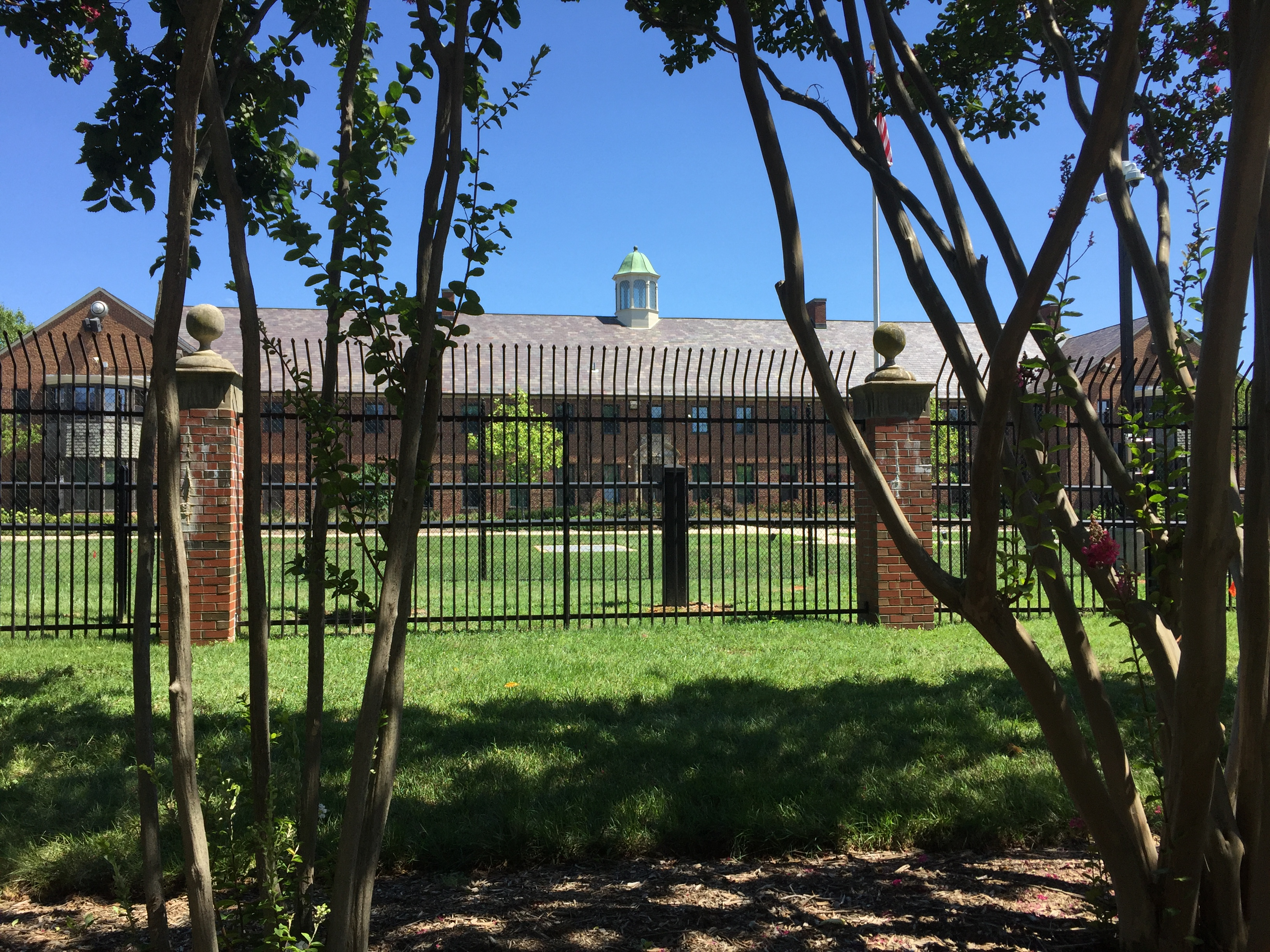
- Main building from the street in 2017
- NRHP reference No.: 16000523
- Added to NRHP: August 10, 2016

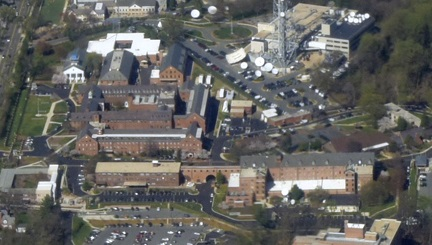
Nebraska Avenue Complex from above in 2016

The Nebraska Avenue Complex (NAC) is a U.S. Department of Homeland Security facility in Washington, DC. It is located at 3801 Nebraska Avenue NW in the AU Park neighborhood, and is bound by Nebraska and Massachusetts Avenue.

The campus was originally built for the Mount Vernon Seminary. Since 1943 it has been owned by the U.S. federal government, and housed various U.S. Navy intelligence and communications functions through the end of the twentieth century, as well as the headquarters of the National Security Agency during 1952–1957. In 2002 it was transferred to the Department of Homeland Security and served as its headquarters until 2019.

== History ==
=== Mount Vernon Seminary ===
Between 1917 and 1942, the complex was the third location of Mount Vernon Seminary.

=== Department of the Navy ===
By the end of 1942, the United States Department of the Navy took over the buildings, and formally acquired the land for $1.1 million US dollars on July 20, 1943. After they acquired the land, the area was renamed to the Communications Supplementary Annex.

Between February 1943 and July 1946, the Annex housed the Communication Security Section, which was relocated from the Main Navy Department building in Washington, D.C. It changed to Navy Communications Station (also known as NAVCOMMSTA Washington (NCSW)) on July 7, 1948, and was redesignated as the Naval Security Station (NAVSECSTA) on September 21, 1950. Between June 1943 and December 1949, the Annex also housed Naval Code and Signals Laboratory.

In September 1950, the Communications Security Group and the Communications Supplementary Activity Washington, merged to officially form the establishment of the Naval Security Group, headquartered at NAVSECSTA.

From 1951 onwards, the Station housed Armed Forces Security Agency units. After its redesignation as the National Security Agency (NSA) in 1952, the Station housed NSA headquarters and its Security Branch, Naval Communications Division. NSA headquarters moved to Fort Meade in 1957.

In 1956, NSA Security Branch, Naval Communications Division was redesigned into Naval Security Group Headquarters Activity. By 1961 it changed to Naval Security Group Headquarters, Washington D.C. and in 1968 to Naval Security Group Command, Washington D.C. In 1971 it was redesigned as Naval Security Group Command Headquarters.

The Communication Security Group (COMNAVSECGRU) headquarters staff officially moved from NAVSECSTA to Fort George G. Meade in November 1995.

Naval Computer and Telecommunications Command was present in the area between December 1990 and August 2001.

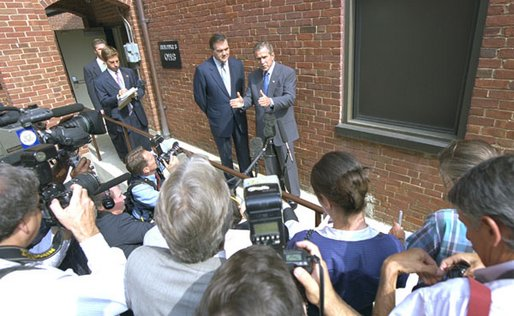
George W. Bush visiting Nebraska Avenue Complex on 19 September 2002.

On October 16, 1998 Naval Security Station officially disestablished and became the Nebraska Avenue Complex. From 1998 to 2005, the Complex was home to Naval Center for Cost Analysis, Naval District Washington Public Safety, Director of Strategic Systems Programs, Office of Civilian Personnel Management and the Navy International Programs Office.

=== Department of Homeland Security ===
In 2002, the Complex housed Office of Homeland Security, established the year prior. After it was reformed into the United States Department of Homeland Security, the Nebraska Avenue Complex became the main headquarters for the department. Since 2005, the Nebraska Avenue Complex has been owned by the General Services Administration.

DHS operations were soon spread across several dozen buildings in the Washington area, however, as the Complex could only accommodate a small portion of its total staff. This prompted a search for a larger headquarters. In 2008, ground was broken for the new DHS headquarters facility on the repurposed former St. Elizabeths Hospital West Campus, and the staff moved there in 2019.

In 2023, the General Services Administration announced that the Nebraska Avenue Complex was being processed for being sold or transferred to another agency. By 2025, only the DHS Office of Intelligence and Analysis remained at the complex.
