= 326th Air Division =

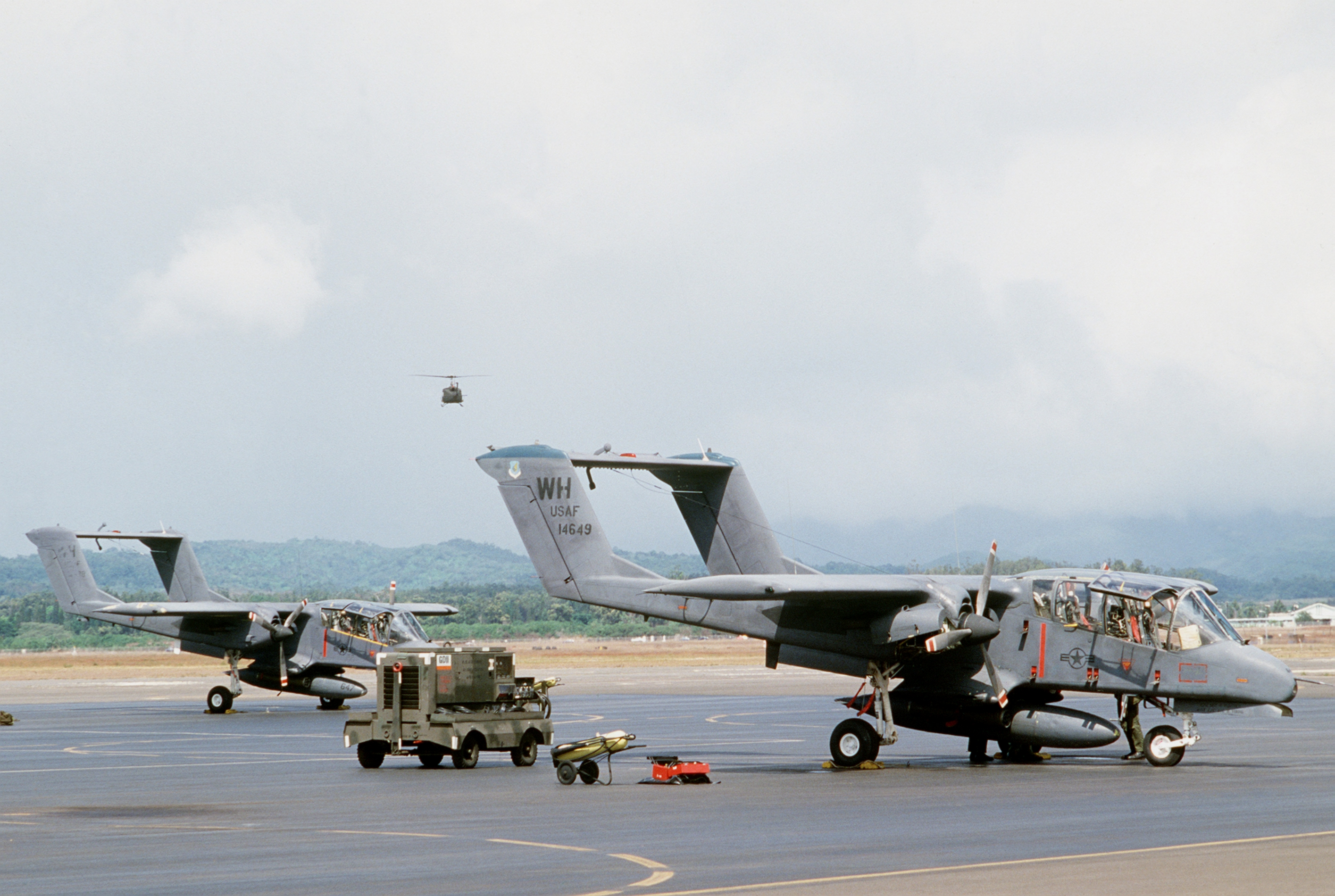
- OV-10As of the 22d Tactical Air Support Squadron at Wheeler AFB (Note: Aircraft are North American OV-10A-25-NH Bronco aircraft (serial 67-14649 in front, this plane was later transferred to the Colombian Air Force). Photo taken 22 August 1984 while the aircraft were taking part in Exercise Opportune Journey 84.)
- Active: 1957–1989
- Country: United States
- Branch: United States Air Force
- Role: Air Defense

Insignia
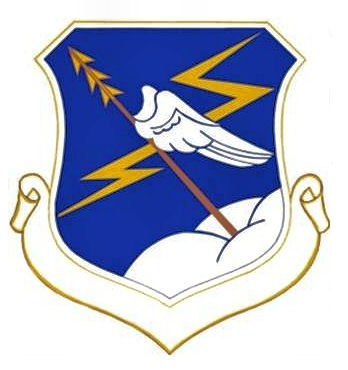
- 326th Air Division emblem (Note: Approved 30 September 1958. Description: Azure, in saltire a lightning flash or and a Hawaiian spear proper triple barbed of the second color mentioned and winged argent emerging from a cloud issuing from sinister base of the last [color mentioned], all within a diminished border of the like [color].)

The 326th Air Division is an inactive United States Air Force organization. It was assigned to Pacific Air Forces at Wheeler Air Force Base, Hawaii, from 1957 until 1989. It was responsible for the air defense of Hawaii for the entire period. In the 1970s the division added a tactical air control mission, and in the 1980s was responsible for air defense of the Mariana Islands as well.

== History ==
The 326th Air Division was activated in the summer of 1957 at Wheeler Air Force Base, Hawaii and assigned to Pacific Air Forces. The division was responsible for the air defense of the Pacific Islands Air Defense Region. After 24 July, the division was also known as the Hawaiian Air Defense Division. Its only subordinate unit was the 12th Communications Squadron, Air Force, which was inactivated six months after the division activated. Until April 1967, the commander of the 6486th Air Base Wing (Pacific Air Forces Base Command) also commanded the division.

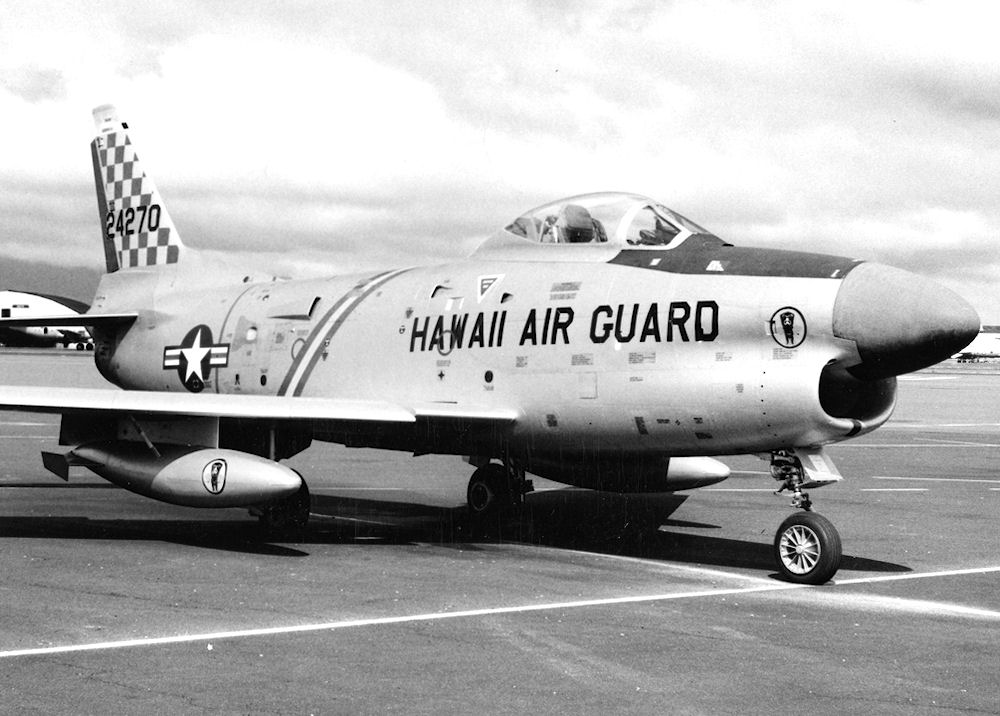
199th Fighter-Interceptor Squadron F-86D (Note: Aircraft is North American F-86D-50-NA Sabre, serial 52-4270.)

The division was programmed to be assigned the 39th Fighter-Interceptor Squadron, which was to move to Hawaii from Komaki Air Base, Japan. However, this move was cancelled and the 39th was instead inactivated. Therefore, to perform its assigned mission, it relied on the radar equipped and Mighty Mouse rocket armed North American F-86L Sabres of the Hawaii Air National Guard's 199th Fighter-Interceptor Squadron at Hickam Air Force Base. The division had operational control of 199th aircraft on alert. The 199th upgraded to Convair F-102 Delta Daggers in 1960.

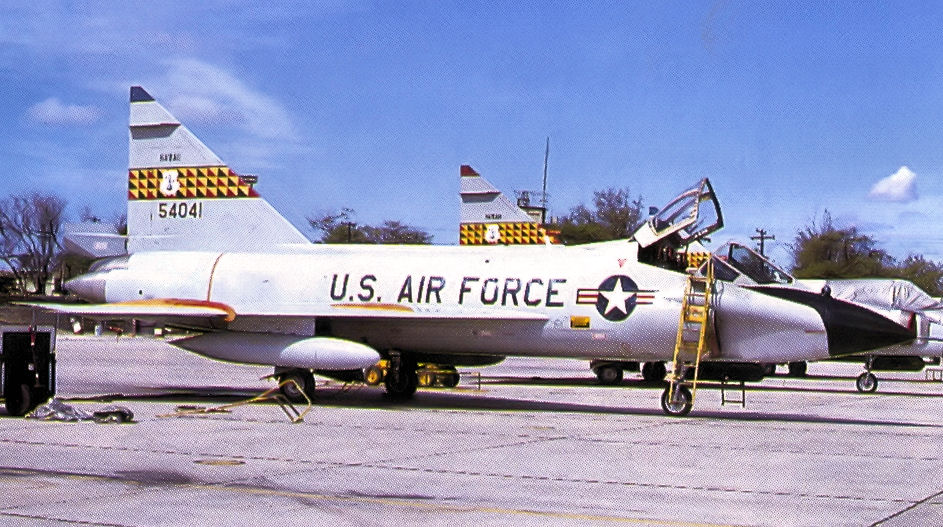
199th Fighter Interceptor Squadron TF-102A (Note: Aircraft is Convair TF-102A-30-CO Delta Dagger serial 55-4041. Photo taken in 1964.)

Its detection and control mission was carried out through another Guard unit, the 169th Aircraft Control and Warning Squadron, located at Koko Crater Air Force Station. The 169th was joined by the 150th Aircraft Control and Warning Squadron at Kokee Air Force Station in October 1961. Earlier that year, the division had moved to Wheeler's Kunia Annex, a facility that was hardened against air attack. In 1965 a third radar squadron joined the network of warning and control stations when the 169th moved to Mount Kaala, while the 109th Aircraft Control and Warning Station took its place at Koko Crater.

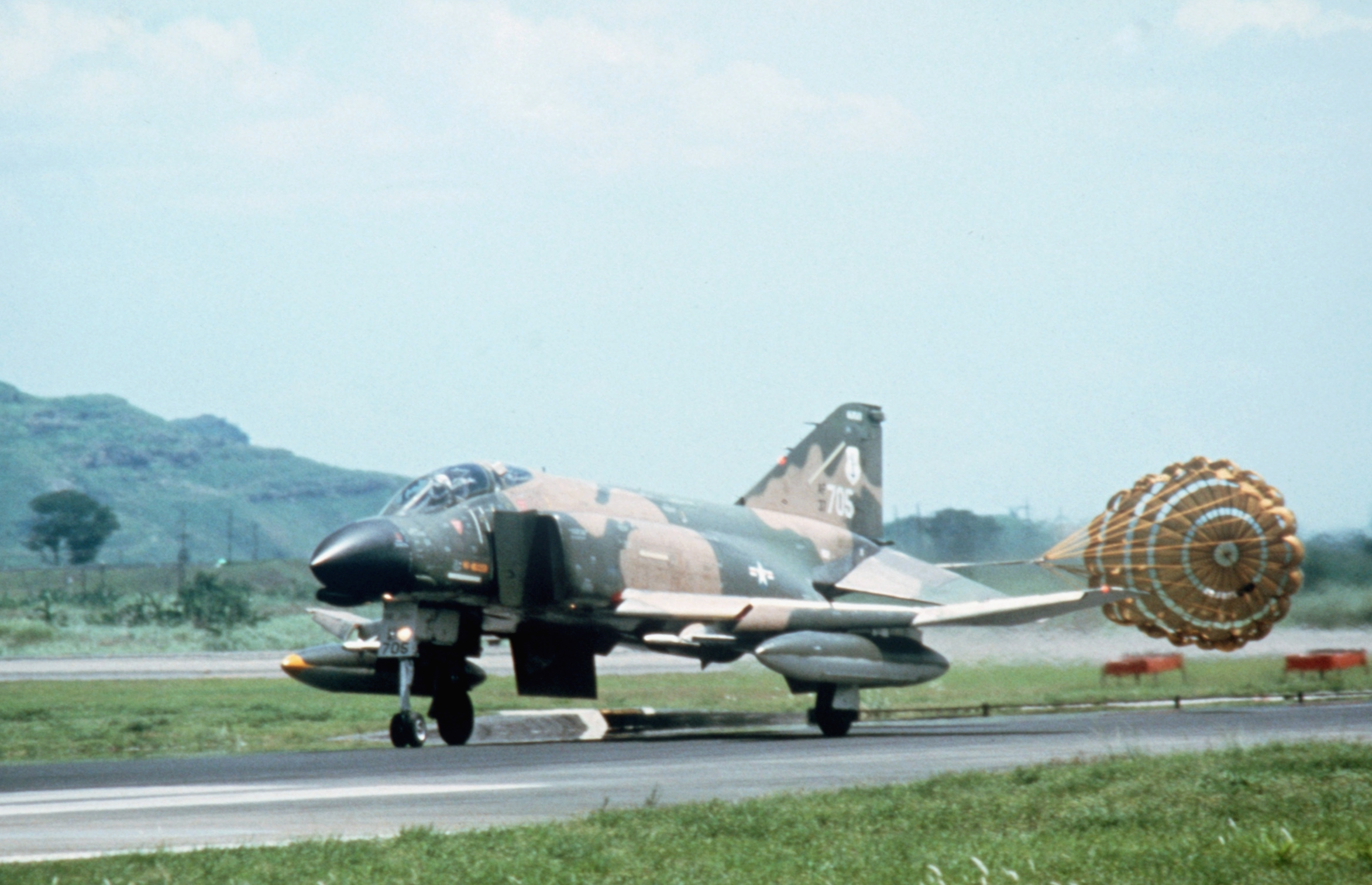
F-4C of the Hawaii ANG (Note: Aircraft is McDonnell F-4C-21-MC Phantom II, serial 63-7705. Photo taken at Clark Air Base in 1979. The plane was later used as a damage repair trainer and salvaged. Baugher, Joe (26 July 2023). "1963 USAF Serial Numbers". Joe Baugher.)

In 1976, the division mission shifted. It returned to Wheeler, where the 6010th Air Defense Flight and the 6491st Air Defense Flight were activated to operate its defense systems. The Hawaiian Guard fighter unit converted from the F-102 to the McDonnell F-4 Phantom II and became the 199th Tactical Fighter Squadron, with a broader mission than air defense. The division partially converted its air defense systems into mobile tactical air control systems. Working in conjunction with the Hawaii Air National Guard, it conducted and participated in numerous tactical air operations and training exercises. Four years later, the division expanded its tactical mission when the 22d Tactical Air Support Squadron was assigned.

In 1983 the division's air defense responsibility was expanded to include the air defense of the Mariana Islands, including Guam. The following year, the division's air defense system was upgraded from a manual to an automated system as its Regional Operational Control Center came online.

In 1989 the division was inactivated and its air defense mission was transferred to the 6010th, which was expanded to become the 6010th Aerospace Defense Group, and its tactical air operations mission and other resources were transferred to the 15th Air Base Wing, which was redesignated the 15th Composite Wing.

== Lineage ==
- Constituted as the 326 Air Division on 22 June 1957

Activated on 1 July 1957
Inactivated on 15 February 1989

=== Assignments ===
- Pacific Air Forces, 1 July 1957 – 15 February 1989

=== Stations ===
- Wheeler Air Force Base, Hawaii, 1 July 1957
- Kunia Communications Annex, Hawaii, 1 June 1961
- Wheeler Air Force Base, Hawaii, 12 October 1976 – 15 February 1989

=== Components ===
Squadrons

- 12th Communications Squadron, Air Force: 1 July 1957 – 18 December 1957
- 22d Tactical Air Support Squadron: 4 April 1980 – 22 September 1988

Flights

- 7th Direct Air Support Flight: 8 October 1964 – 15 September 1968
- 6010th Aerospace Defense Flight: 15 October 1976 – 15 February 1989
- 6491st Air Defense Flight: 15 October 1976 – 15 February 1989

=== Aircraft ===
- Cessna O-2 Skymaster, 1980 – 1983
- North American Rockwell OV-10 Bronco, 1983 – 1988

=== Commanders ===
- Brig Gen Kurt M. Landon, 1 August 1957
- Col Clayton B. Claassen, 29 May 1958
- Brig Gen Paul T. Preuss, 1 September 1958
- Brig Gen Edwin S. Chickering, 6 August 1959
- Col Noel T. Cumbaa, 28 June 1961
- Brig Gen John A. Rouse, 27 July 1961
- Col Philip A. Sykes, 3 August 1965
- Col Harold F. Layhee, 1 August 1967
- Col Edward C. Unger, 19 July 1968
- Col Ernest W. Pate, 6 January 1970
- Col William B. Colgan, c. January 1971
- Col James R. Hopkins, 2 July 1972
- Col Robert A. Preciado, 19 June 1973
- Col Paul J. Gilmore, 23 August 1974
- Col Robert S. Johnson, 3 February 1977
- Col Frederick B. Hoenniger, 1 August 1979
- Col Martin H. Mahrt, 19 June 1981
- Col Barrett V. Johnson, 11 July 1983
- Col Robert R. Bartlett, 30 June 1986 – 15 February 1989

== See also ==
- List of United States Air Force air divisions
- List of United States Air Force aircraft control and warning squadrons
