= Kunia Regional SIGINT Operations Center =

Former US military facility in Hawaii

Coordinates: 21°28′32.99″N 158°3′4.16″W

U.S. Department of Defense Central Security Service

The Kunia Regional SIGINT Operations Center (KRSOC, also pronounced "Kay-ARSock"), also known as the Kunia Tunnel or the Regional Signals Intelligence Operations Center Kunia, was a United States National Security Agency facility that was located on Kunia Road between Kunia Camp and Wheeler Army Airfield in central Oahu, Hawaii. In 2012, the facility was replaced by the Hawaii Cryptologic Center.

== History ==
In response to the attack on Pearl Harbor in 1941, the installation was designed and built as a bomb-proof, underground open bay with a 250,000-square-foot (23,000 m^{2}) floorspace to facilitate aircraft assembly in proximity to Wheeler Army Airfield. During the later part of World War II and in the decades that followed it was used primarily for cryptologic and intelligence activities.

Military units that occupied the structure include the U.S. Navy's Naval Security Group Activity Hawaii (a combination of the former NSGA Kunia and NSGA Pearl Harbor) and the U.S. Army Military Intelligence Corps 500th Military Intelligence Brigade.

== See also ==
- NSGA Kunia
