= Air Force District of Washington =

Direct reporting unit of the United States Air Force

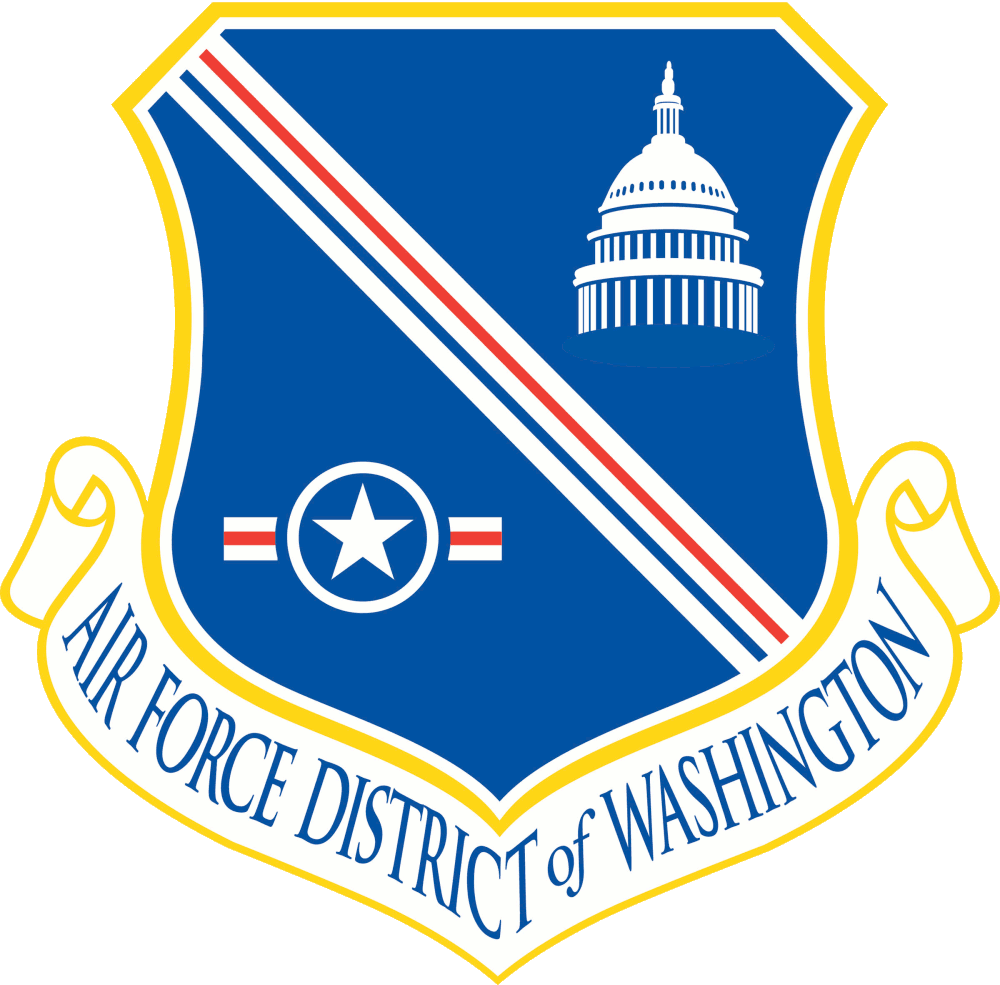
- Unit emblem
- Active: 1985–1994; 2005 – present
- Country: United States
- Branch: United States Air Force
- Type: Direct Reporting Unit
- Role: Contingency response, ceremonial and operational support in the National Capital Region
- Part of: HQ Air Force (administratively); Joint Task Force-National Capital Region (operationally)
- Headquarters: Joint Base Andrews, Maryland
- Motto: Pride ...Teamwork ...Success
- Decorations: Air Force Organization Excellence Award
- Website: Official website

Commanders
- Commander: Major General Neil R. Richardson
- Deputy Commander: Colonel Keith A. Davidson
- Command Chief: Chief Master Sergeant Michael Wynne

The Air Force District of Washington (AFDW) is a Direct Reporting Unit of the United States Air Force. AFDW oversees Air Force operations in the Washington, D.C. region (also known as the "National Capital Region" or "NCR").

As a Direct Reporting Unit, AFDW is directly subordinate to the Chief of Staff, Headquarters, United States Air Force, and serves as the Air Force service component to the JFHQ-NCR. AFDW was originally headquartered on Bolling Air Force Base, but changed to Joint Base Andrews-Naval Air Facility Washington (JBA-NAFW).

== History ==
=== Background ===
AFDW originates back to the post-World War II era when Bolling Field Command was established on 15 December 1946. Bolling Field Command absorbed functions from various support organizations in the Washington, D.C. vicinity. It was redesignated Headquarters Command, USAF, on 17 March 1958. When Headquarters Command, USAF, inactivated on 1 July 1976, many of its functions passed to Military Airlift Command.

=== Establishment ===
The Air Force District of Washington was constituted and activated on 1 October 1985. Due to declining defense budgets, it was inactivated on 15 July 1994.

The unit was reactivated on 7 July 2005, to realign the Air Force command structure in the National Capital Region with the other military services and to improve Air Force support to Joint Force Headquarters – National Capital Region (JFHQ-NCR).

== Mission ==
AFDW oversees two wings and one group on JBA-NAFW: the 11th Wing, the 316th Wing and the 844th Communication Group. The 844th Communications Group have a specialized communications mission and serve as the central communications support group for the Air Force in the National Capital Region (NCR). The 316th Wing fulfills duties as the host base organization of Joint Base Andrews, while also supporting AFDW requirements. AFDW also supports airmen in more than 33,000 Airmen in over 200 locations in 108 countries.

AFDW serves as the Air Force service component for coordination purposes to JTF-NCR and the supporting command to Joint Task Force National Capital Region. JTF-NCR has an emergency or major event operation 'mobilization' function as Joint Task Force-National Capital Region. Under the Joint Task Force NCR (JTF-NCR), the 320th Air Expeditionary Wing (320 AEW) activates and becomes the Air Force service component of JTF-NCR. The Commander of AFDW serves as the Commander, 320 AEW. Air Force Mission Directive 13 delineates missions and assigned duties applicable to AFDW in both its worldwide Air Force service role and its JTF-NCR Air Force service component role.

== Component units ==
Air Force District of Washington comprises the following wings and major units.

=== Headquarters ===
- Headquarters Air Force District of Washington (Joint Base Andrews, Maryland)

=== Permanent units ===
- 11th Wing (Joint Base Anacostia–Bolling, Washington, D.C.)
  - US Air Force Band
  - US Air Force Chaplaincy (Arlington National Cemetery)
  - US Air Force Honor Guard
- 316th Wing (Joint Base Andrews) – UH-1N Iroquois
- 844th Communications Group (Joint Base Andrews)

=== Expeditionary units ===
- 320th Air Expeditionary Wing (Joint Base Anacostia–Bolling)

== Decorations ==
Air Force Organizational Excellence Awards

- 1 October 1985 – 30 June 1987
- 1 November 1991 – 31 October 1993
- 7 July 2005 – 31 December 2006

== List of commanders ==
No.	Commander		Term		
No.	Portrait	Name	Took office	Left office	Term length
1	Edward N. Giddings	Brigadier General; Edward N. Giddings (born 1935)	1 October 1985	November 1988	~ 3 years, 31 days
2	Ralph R. Rohatsch Jr.	Brigadier General; Ralph R. Rohatsch Jr. (born 1940)	November 1988	July 1990	~ 1 year, 242 days
3	James L. Vick	Brigadier General; James L. Vick (born 1943)	July 1990	~ September 1992	~ 2 years, 62 days
4	Stevan B. Richards	Colonel; Stevan B. Richards	~ September 1992	15 July 1994	~ 1 year, 317 days
5	Duane A. Jones	Brigadier General; Duane A. Jones	7 July 2005	14 April 2006	281 days
6	Robert L. Smolen	Major General; Robert L. Smolen	14 April 2006	29 June 2007	1 year, 76 days
7	Frank Gorenc	Major General; Frank Gorenc (born 1957)	29 June 2007	6 August 2008	1 year, 38 days
8	Ralph J. Jodice II	Major General; Ralph J. Jodice II (born 1955)	6 August 2008	18 November 2009	1 year, 104 days
9	Darrell D. Jones	Major General; Darrell D. Jones	18 November 2009	9 December 2010	1 year, 21 days
10	Darren W. McDew	Major General; Darren W. McDew (born 1960)	9 December 2010	26 July 2012	1 year, 230 days
11	Sharon K.G. Dunbar	Major General; Sharon K.G. Dunbar	26 July 2012	22 July 2014	1 year, 361 days
12	Darryl W. Burke	Major General; Darryl W. Burke	22 July 2014	21 June 2017	2 years, 334 days
13	James A. Jacobson	Major General; James A. Jacobson	21 June 2017	9 July 2019	2 years, 18 days
14	Ricky Rupp	Major General; Ricky Rupp	9 July 2019	20 July 2021	2 years, 11 days
15	Joel D. Jackson	Major General; Joel D. Jackson	20 July 2021	6 September 2023	2 years, 48 days
16	Daniel A. DeVoe	Major General; Daniel A. DeVoe	6 September 2023	23 June 2026	2 years, 290 days
17	Neil R. Richardson	Major General; Neil R. Richardson	23 June 2026	Incumbent	66 days

== See also ==
- United States Army Military District of Washington
- Naval District Washington
