= Kyle Kremer =

U.S. Air Force general

Kyle J. Kremer
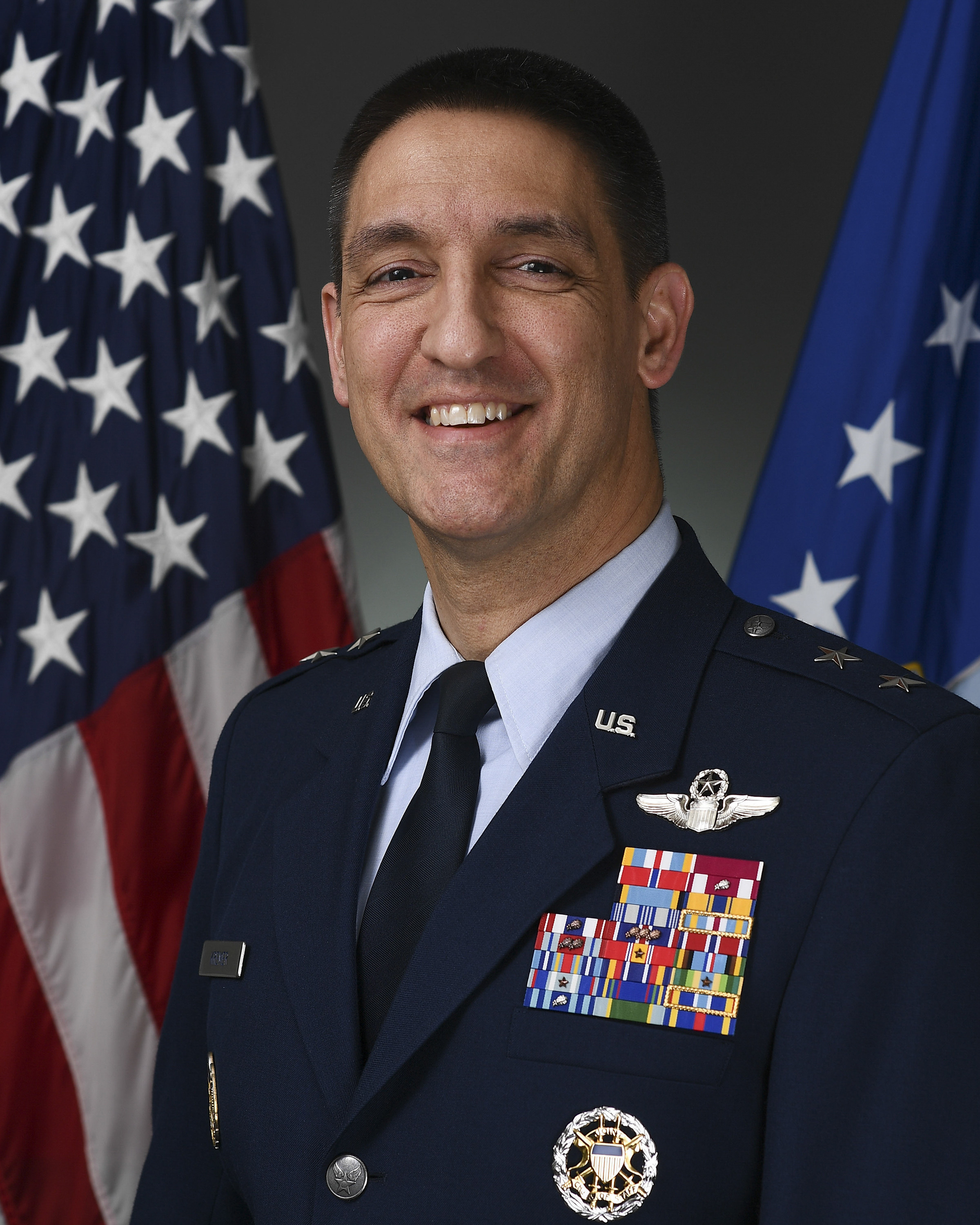
- Military career
- Allegiance: United States
- Branch: United States Air Force
- Service years: 1990–2022
- Rank: Major General
- Commands: 375th Air Mobility Wing; 56th Airlift Squadron
- Awards: Defense Superior Service Medal (2); Legion of Merit; Bronze Star Medal

Kyle J. Kremer is a retired United States Air Force major general who last served as the Director of Strategic Plans, Requirements and Programs of the Air Mobility Command. Previously, he was the Director of Global Reach Programs of the Office of the Assistant Secretary of the Air Force for Acquisition, Technology and Logistics.

Military offices
| Preceded by David Almand | Commander of the 375th Air Mobility Wing; 2013–2015 | Succeeded by Laura Lenderman |
