= Laura Lenderman =

U.S. Air Force General

Laura L. Lenderman
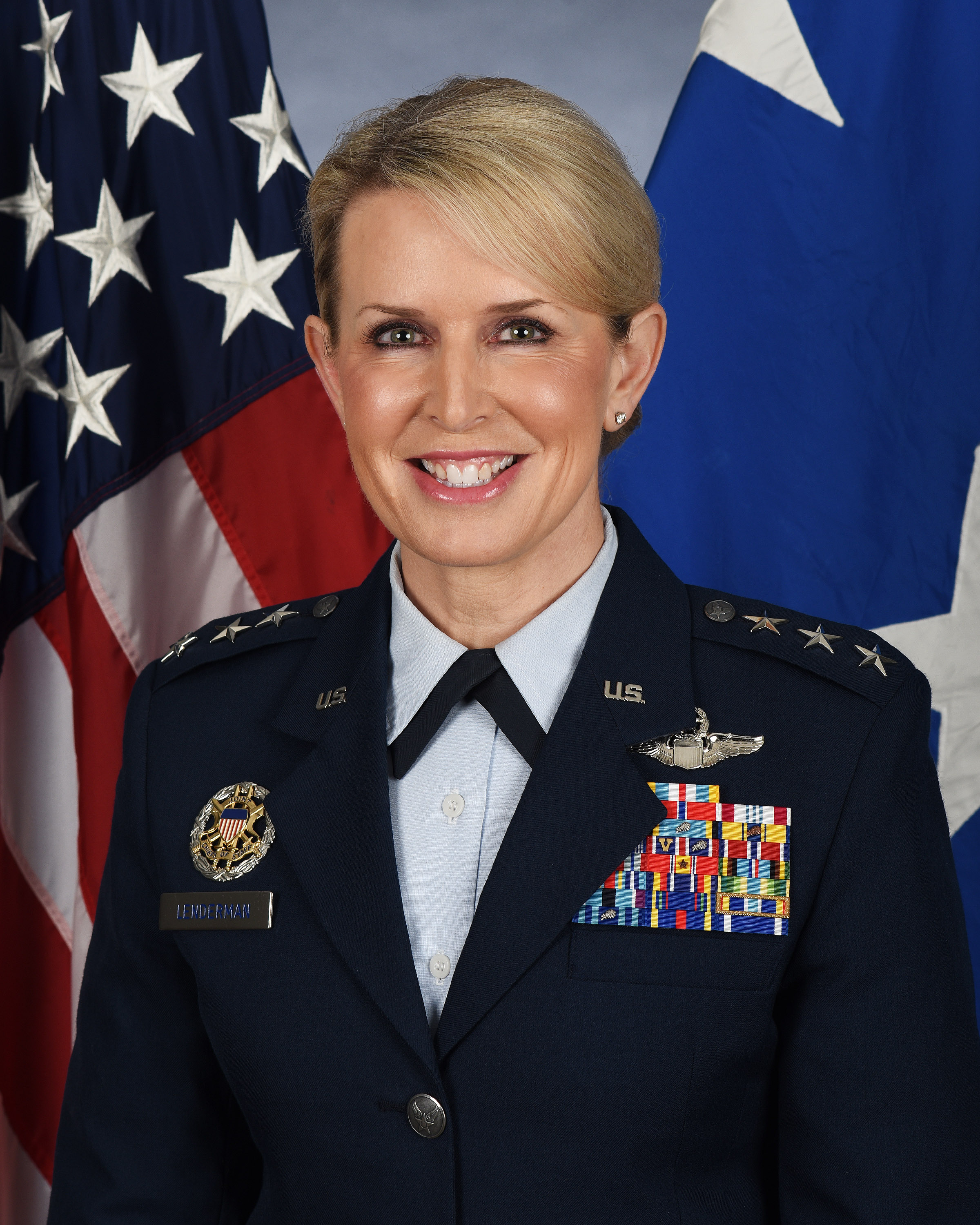
- Official portrait, 2024
- Military career
- Allegiance: United States
- Branch: United States Air Force
- Service years: 1993–present
- Rank: Lieutenant General
- Commands: 502nd Air Base Wing; 375th Air Mobility Wing; 15th Air Mobility Operations Squadron
- Awards: Defense Superior Service Medal; Legion of Merit (2)

Laura L. Lenderman (née Cook) is a United States Air Force lieutenant general who serves as deputy commander of the Pacific Air Forces. She most recently served as the director of operations of the United States Transportation Command. She previously served as the director of operations, strategic deterrence, and nuclear integration of the Air Mobility Command.

== Military career ==
In 2022, Lenderman was assigned to replace Major General Corey Martin as director of operations of the United States Transportation Command.

In April 2023, Lenderman was nominated for promotion to lieutenant general and assignment as deputy commander of the Pacific Air Forces.

== Dates of rank ==
Promotions
Insignia	Rank	Date
	Lieutenant General	23 February 2024
	Major General	7 May 2021
	Brigadier General	1 August 2018
	Colonel	1 September 2011
	Lieutenant Colonel	1 September 2007
	Major	1 February 2004
	Captain	21 September 1997
	First Lieutenant	21 September 1995
	Second Lieutenant	21 September 1993

Military offices
Preceded by Kyle Kremer	Commander of the 375th Air Mobility Wing; 2015–2017	Succeeded by John O. Howard
Preceded by Heather L. Pringle	Commander of the 502nd Air Base Wing; 2018–2020	Succeeded by Caroline M. Miller
Preceded by James R. Sears	Director of Plans, Programs, and Requirements of the Air Education and Training Command; 2020–2021	Succeeded by Eric A. Carney
Preceded by Joel D. Jackson	Director of Operations, Strategic Deterrence and Nuclear Integration of the Air Mobility Command; 2021–2022	Succeeded by Darren R. Cole
Preceded by Corey Martin	Director of Operations of the United States Transportation Command; 2022–2024	Succeeded by Daniel Tulley
Preceded by James A. Jacobson	Deputy Commander of the Pacific Air Forces; 2024–present	Incumbent
