= Pacific Air Forces =

Major command of the United States Air Force responsible for the Indo-Pacific region

- Shield of Pacific Air Forces
- Active: 31 July 1944 – present (82 years, 1 month) Detailed: 1 July 1957 – present (Pacific Air Forces) 1 January 1947 – 1 July 1957 (as Far East Air Force) 6 December 1945 – 1 January 1947 (as Pacific Air Command, United States Army) 31 July 1944 – 6 December 1945 (as Far East Air Forces)
- Country: United States of America
- Branch: United States Air Force; United States Army ( Army Air Forces; 31 July 1944- 26 September 1947)
- Type: Major Command
- Role: "PACAF, in coordination with other components, allies, and partners, provides USINDOPACOM with continuous unrivaled air, space, and cyberspace capabilities to ensure regional stability and security."
- Size: 31,299 airmen 334 aircraft
- Part of: United States Indo-Pacific Command
- Headquarters: Hickam Air Force Base, Joint Base Pearl Harbor–Hickam, Hawaii, U.S.
- Engagements: World War II – Asiatic-Pacific Theater * New Guinea campaign * Battle of Leyte * Battle of Luzon Korean War* Vietnam War Laotian Civil War Cambodian Campaign

- Decorations: Air Force Organization Excellence Award Philippine Presidential Unit Citation
- Website: www.pacaf.af.mil

Commanders
- Commander: Gen Kevin B. Schneider
- Deputy Commander: Lt Gen Laura L. Lenderman
- Deputy Commander - RAAF: AVM David Titheridge
- Command Chief: CCM Kathleen M. McCool

Aircraft flown
- Attack: A-10C
- Electronic warfare: E-3B/C
- Fighter: F-15C/D, F-16C/D, F-22A
- Multirole helicopter: HH-60G, UH-1N
- Transport: C-12J, C-17A, C-37A, C-40B, C-130H
- Tanker: KC-135R

The Pacific Air Forces (PACAF) is a major command (MAJCOM) of the United States Air Force and is also the air component command of the United States Indo-Pacific Command (USINDOPACOM). PACAF is headquartered at the Hickam AFB portion of Joint Base Pearl Harbor–Hickam, Hawaii, and is one of two USAF MAJCOMs assigned outside the continental United States, the other being the United States Air Forces in Europe – Air Forces Africa. Over the past eighty plus years, PACAF has been engaged in combat in the Korean and Vietnamese Wars and Operations Desert Storm, Southern Watch, Northern Watch, Enduring Freedom, and Iraqi Freedom.

The mission of Pacific Air Forces is to provide ready air and space power to promote U.S. interests in the Asia-Pacific region during peacetime, through crisis, and in war. PACAF organizes, trains, and equips the 45,000 Total Force personnel of the Regular Air Force, the Air Force Reserve, and the Air National Guard with the tools necessary to support the Commander of United States Indo-Pacific Command. PACAF comprises three numbered Air Forces, nine main bases, and nearly 375 aircraft.

The command's area of responsibility extends from the west coast of the United States to the east coast of Asia and from the Arctic to the Antarctic, more than 100,000,000 square miles (260,000,000 km^{2}). The area is home to nearly two billion people who live in 44 countries.

== History ==
=== Far East Air Forces ===
The beginnings of PACAF can be traced back to June 1944, when Major General St. Clair Streett's Thirteenth Air Force was added to Allied Air Forces, South West Pacific Area. At approximately the same time, Lieutenant General George Kenney created the Far East Air Forces (FEAF) from his Fifth Air Force headquarters, while the Advanced Echelon became the Fifth Air Force under Major General Ennis Whitehead, Sr.

The RAAF also formed the Australian First Tactical Air Force under Air Commodore Harry Cobby in October 1944, and when General Douglas MacArthur became commander of all Army forces in the Pacific, the Seventh Air Force was added as well.

Far East Air Forces (FEAF) was activated on 3 August 1944, at Brisbane, Queensland, Australia. FEAF (Provisional) had actually been created on 15 June 1944, and Fifth Air Force assigned to it. FEAF was subordinate to the U.S. Army Forces Far East and served as the headquarters of Allied Air Forces Southwest Pacific Area.

The creation of FEAF consolidated the command and control authority over United States Army Air Forces (USAAF) units widely deployed throughout the southwest Pacific in World War II. On 15 June 1945, Fifth Air Force, Clark Field, Luzon, Philippines; Seventh Air Force, Hickam Field, Hawaii, USA; and Thirteenth Air Force, Clark Field, Luzon, Philippines were assigned to FEAF to support combat operations in the Pacific.

With the end of World War II in September 1945, the USAAF found its units deployed throughout the Pacific, from Hawaii to India, from Japan to Australia, and based on a hundred island airstrips, along with bases in China and Burma. A realignment of these forces was needed by the USAAF to better organize its forces in the Pacific for peacetime. On 6 December 1945, Far East Air Forces was redesignated Pacific Air Command, United States Army (PACUSA), and its Air Forces were redeployed as follows:

- Fifth Air Force: Assigned to Tokyo, Japan

Primary mission performing allied occupational assistance on the Japanese Home Islands and the Korean Peninsula.

- Seventh Air Force: Assigned to Hickam Field, Hawaii

Returning to its prewar mission for the defense of the Hawaiian Islands, including Midway Island; the Marshall Islands and other Central Pacific islands

- Eighth Air Force: Assigned to Kadena Army Air Base, Okinawa

Defense of the Ryukyu Islands, including Iwo Jima

- Thirteenth Air Force: Assigned to Clark Field, Philippines

Defense of the Philippines, New Guinea and the Solomon Islands

- Twentieth Air Force: Assigned to Harmon Field, Guam, Mariana Islands

Reassigned to PACUSA 6 December 1945; provided a strategic deterrent for the entire Western Pacific region

With this realignment and reassignment of forces, PACUSA controlled and commanded all United States Army Air Forces in the Far East and Southwest Pacific, and all air forces were placed under one Air Force commander for the first time.

In November 1945, the 509th Composite Group left North Field on the island of Tinian and was reassigned to Roswell Army Air Field, New Mexico, taking the atomic bomb delivery capability of PACUSA to the United States. Shortly afterwards, Eighth Air Force was reassigned to the newly established Strategic Air Command (SAC) on 7 June 1946 and its strategic units reassigned to the 1st Bombardment Division.

The major mission of PACUSA in the postwar years (1946–1950) was occupation duty in Japan and the demilitarization of the Japanese society in conjunction with the United States Army. In addition, PACUSA helped to support atomic bomb testing in the Pacific Proving Grounds beginning with the Operation Crossroads test on Bikini Atoll in the Marshall Islands in 1946.

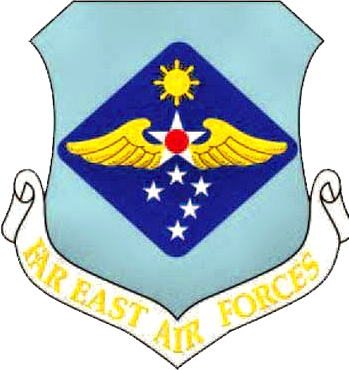
FEAF Emblem, 1954

With the impending establishment of the United States Air Force as an independent service later that year, PACUSA was redesignated Far East Air Forces (FEAF) on 1 January 1947. On that same date, Seventh Air Force in Hawaii was inactivated with its organization absorbed by HQ, FEAF.

==== USAF established ====
Coinciding with the establishment of the United States Air Force (USAF) as an independent service in September 1947, PACUSA/FEAF deployments to Korea prior to the 1948 partition of the country helped in the establishment of the Republic of Korea (e.g., South Korea), along with the transfer of surplus military equipment and other aid to French Indochina as well as aid to the Nationalist Chinese during the Chinese Civil War which resumed after the end of World War II (1945–1949).

=== Korean War ===
On 25 June 1950, the armed forces of the Democratic People's Republic of Korea (e.g., North Korea) invaded South Korea. On 27 June, the United Nations Security Council voted to assist the South Koreans in resisting the invasion. President Harry Truman authorized General of the Army Douglas MacArthur (commander of the US occupying forces in Japan) to commit units to the battle. MacArthur ordered General George E. Stratemeyer, CIC of FEAF, to attack attacking North Korean forces between the front lines and the 38th parallel.

==== Order of Battle, June 1950 ====
Despite the post-World War II demobilization of United States armed forces, the United States Air Force still had substantial forces in the Pacific to oppose the North Korean military. When the North Koreans crossed the 38th parallel on 25 June 1950, FEAF consisted of the following primary units*:

- Fifth Air Force (Japan)

Itazuke Air Base, Kyushu

8th Fighter-Bomber Wing/Group (F-80, F-82)

Johnson Air Base, Honshu

3d Bombardment Wing/Group (B-26)

Nagoya Air Base, Honshu

347th Fighter All Weather Wing/Group (inactivated 24 June 1950)

Tachikawa Air Base, Honshu

374th Troop Carrier Wing/Group (C-54)

Yokota Air Base, Honshu

35th Fighter-Interceptor Wing/Group (F-80, RF-80, F-82)

Misawa Air Base, Honshu

49th Fighter-Bomber Wing/Group (F-80)

- Twentieth Air Force (Okinawa and the Marianas)

Naha Air Base, Okinawa

51st Fighter-Interceptor Wing/Group (F-80, F-82)

Kadena Air Base, Okinawa

31st Photo Reconnaissance Squadron, VLR** (RB-29)

Andersen Air Force Base, Guam

19th Bombardment Wing/Group (B-29)

- Thirteenth Air Force (Philippines)

Clark Air Force Base, Luzon

18th Fighter-Bomber Wing/Group (F-80)
21st Troop Carrier Squadron (C-54)
6204th Photo Mapping Flight (RB-17)

At that time, the combat units of the FEAF were equipped with the Lockheed F-80 Shooting Star jet fighter, the North American F-82 Twin Mustang all-weather escort fighter, the Douglas B-26 Invader light attack bomber, the Lockheed RF-80A Shooting Star tactical reconnaissance aircraft, and the Boeing B-29 Superfortress heavy bomber. Support units were equipped with the Douglas C-54 Skymaster cargo aircraft and the Boeing RB-17 Flying Fortress, a former heavy bomber converted to photo mapping duties. FEAF personnel also trained, supported and flew with the fledgling Republic of Korea Air Force (ROKAF) under the Bout One Project, primarily operating excess World War II-vintage F-51D Mustang fighter aircraft transferred from USAF inventory, re-marked with ROKAF insignia, and operated in interdiction/ground attack and close air support roles.

* Elements of the 2d and 3d Air Rescue squadrons, attached to FEAF by the Military Air Transport Service (MATS), were located at various bases where they could best perform emergency rescue services with their SB-17 Flying Fortresses. The 512th and 514th Weather Reconnaissance Squadrons of the 2143d Air Weather Wing were located at Yokota Air Base, Japan, and Andersen Air Force Base, Guam. All USAF units engaged in combat during the Korean War were under the overall command of Far East Air Forces.
** The 31st Photo Reconnaissance Squadron was a Strategic Air Command unit, attached to FEAF for operations. On 29 June 1950, the unit began flying combat missions over the Korean Peninsula in their RB-29 Superfortresses to provide FEAF Bomber Command with target and bomb-damage assessment photography.

In response to the threat posed by the introduction of Soviet-built (and often Soviet-manned) MiG-15 jet fighters into the Korean People's Air Force (KPAF), USAF F-80 and F-82 units were later re-equipped with the North American F-86 Sabre jet fighter between December 1951 and Spring 1953. Eventually, these USAF F-86 units would establish a kill ratio of 10:1 versus their KPAF adversaries. During the Korean War (1950–1953), alongside the U.S. Navy and small allied contingents, FEAF's Fifth Air Force bore the brunt of the coalition air combat operations.

=== Cold War ===
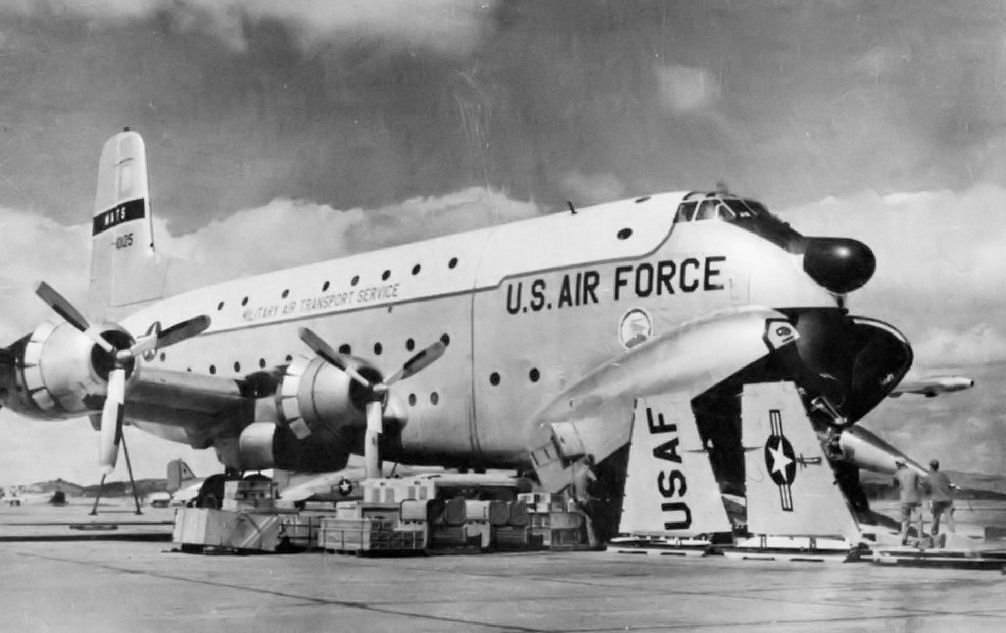
C-124 at Hamilton AFB, California being prepared to load a Lockheed F-104 Starfighter being transported to Formosa, 1958.

With the 1953 Korean Armistice, the deployed SAC and TAC units to Japan and Korea were gradually withdrawn, and returned to the United States. Twentieth Air Force was inactivated on 1 March 1955, leaving FEAF with two Air Forces, the Fifth in Japan and the Thirteenth in the Philippines, although units were maintained on Guam and Okinawa.

==== PACAF established ====
On 1 July 1954, Pacific Air Force was activated at Hickam Air Force Base, Territory of Hawaii, and assigned to Far East Air Forces (FEAF), which was headquartered in Japan. Pacific Air Force at Hickam functioned primarily as the Air Force staff component and planning element of U.S. Pacific Command. On 1 July 1956, Pacific Air Force was redesignated Pacific Air Force/FEAF (Rear). Headquarters FEAF began preparations to move from Japan to Hawaii. Smith assumed additional responsibilities as deputy commander, Far East Air Forces. This was followed on 1 July 1957 with United States Far East Air Forces being redesignated as Pacific Air Forces (PACAF) and transferring its headquarters to Hickam AFB, Territory of Hawaii.

On 1 October 1955, the Far East Air Materiel Command was transferred from Far East Air Forces to Air Force Materiel Command.

Tensions between the Communist Chinese on the mainland and the Nationalist Chinese on Taiwan dominated FEAF and PACAF during the mid and late 1950s. The 1954 and 1958 Taiwan Strait Crisis both threatened to break out into a war, and USAF F-104C fighter squadrons were deployed to Kung Kuan Air Base on Taiwan in 1958. The question of "Matsu and Quemoy" became an issue in the 1960 American Presidential election when Richard Nixon accused John F. Kennedy of being unwilling to commit to using nuclear weapons if the People's Republic of China invaded the Nationalist outposts.

By 1960, PACAF maintained a combat-ready deterrent force of some 35 squadrons, operating from 10 major bases in a half-dozen countries.

=== Vietnam War ===
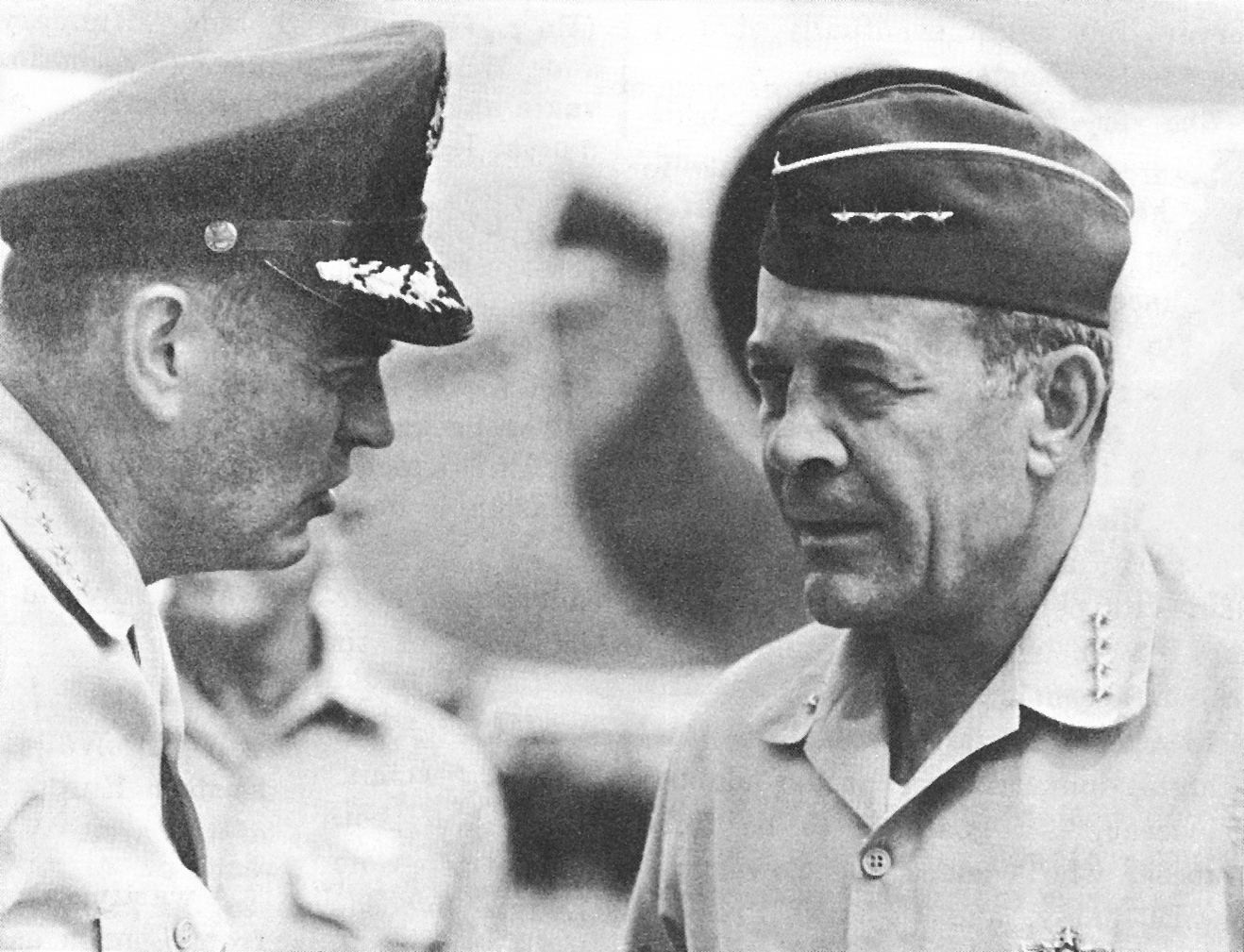
Pacific Air Force Commander General Joseph J. Nazzaro with Seventh Air Force Commander General George S. Brown. Both Pacific Air Force and Seventh Air Force which was United States Air Force primary air component command in South Vietnam played major role in overseeing all United States Air Force operations during the Vietnam War.

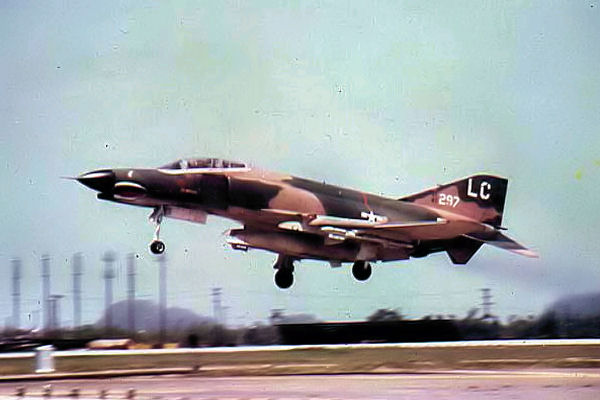
F-4E of the 421st Tactical Fighter Squadron, Da Nang Air Base

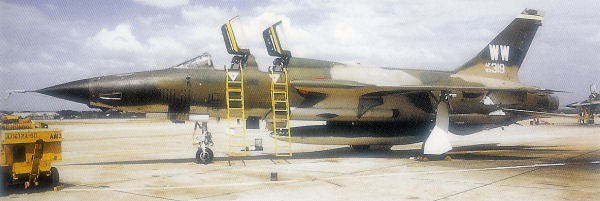
Republic F-105F/G-1-RE Thunderchief, AF Ser. No. 63-8319 of Det 1, 561st Tactical Fighter (Wild Weasel) Squadron, Korat Royal Thai Air Force Base

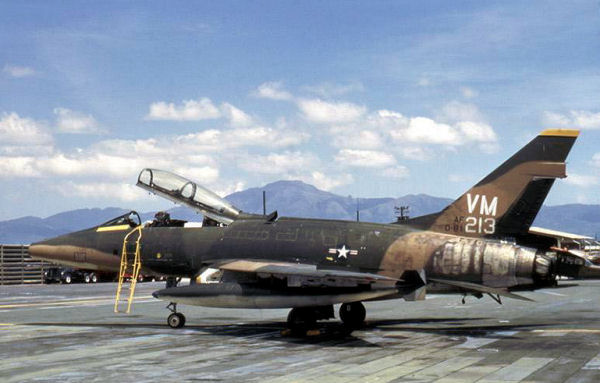
North American F-100F-20-NA Super Sabre, AF Ser. No. 58-1213 of the 352d Fighter Squadron at Phan Rang Air Base, South Vietnam, 1971

In the early 1960s, communist military strength and firepower in Vietnam increased. As a result, PACAF began a buildup in the area with the addition of troops and better arms and equipment.

In response to what has become known as the Gulf of Tonkin incident in 1964, Tactical Air Command (TAC) pilots, navigators and support personnel found themselves deployed from the Contiguous US (CONUS) to PACAF bases such as Da Nang Air Base and Phan Rang AB in South Vietnam. Takhli Royal Thai Air Force Base and Korat Royal Thai Air Force Base in Thailand were also used by deployed TAC fighter squadrons.

As the American effort in Southeast Asia increased, TAC permanently reassigned entire wings of aircraft from CONUS bases to PACAF and increased the number of rotated tactical fighter and reconnaissance squadrons on rotating Temporary Duty (TDY) commitments to PACAF bases in Vietnam and Thailand, along with units to South Korea, Japan and the Philippines. On a daily basis, flight crews would hurl themselves and their planes at targets across the area of operations over the skies of North and South Vietnam.

At the height of the Vietnam War (1968), PACAF commanded forces at major air bases in the following countries:

- Japan (Fifth Air Force)
- South Korea (Fifth Air Force)
- Philippines (Thirteenth Air Force)
- Taiwan (Thirteenth Air Force)
- South Vietnam (Seventh Air Force)
- Thailand (Seventh/Thirteenth Air Force)

In 1962, PACAF activated the 2d Air Division to be the main warfighting organization in South Vietnam. As the conflict escalated, Seventh Air Force was activated on 1 April 1966, replacing 2d Air Force. PACAF units in Thailand were under the command of Thirteenth Air Force beginning in 1964, then in 1973 a joint Seventh/Thirteenth Air Force headquarters was established in Bangkok to direct PACAF forces in Thailand operating in Indochina (until 15 August 1973), and Thailand until the final USAF withdrawal from Southeast Asia in the beginning of 1976.

By 1970, direct PACAF involvement the war was winding down as the conflict was being increasingly turned over to the South Vietnamese under the process known as Vietnamization. Units from the Republic of Vietnam Air Force (VNAF) took on more and more combat to defend their nation while PACAF tactical air strength was being reduced as several air bases were turned over to the VNAF. Combat aircraft of PACAF flew their last strikes in Cambodia 15 August 1973, writing the final chapter to the long and costly history of active American participation in the Indochina War. The Paris Peace Accords of 1973 ended PACAF's use of South Vietnamese bases, and by 1976 bases in Thailand were turned over to the Thai government. In 1979, normalization of relations with the People's Republic of China also led to the withdrawal of PACAF personnel from Ching Chuan Kang Air Base, Republic of China (Taiwan).

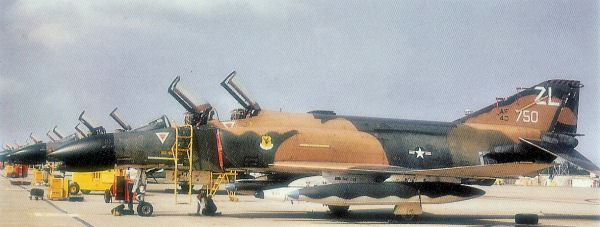
McDonnell F-4C-23-MC Phantoms of the 44th TFS/18th TFW deployed at Ching Chuan Kang Air Base Taichung, Taiwan, 2 October 1973. Serial 64-0750 in foreground.

==== Post Cold War ====
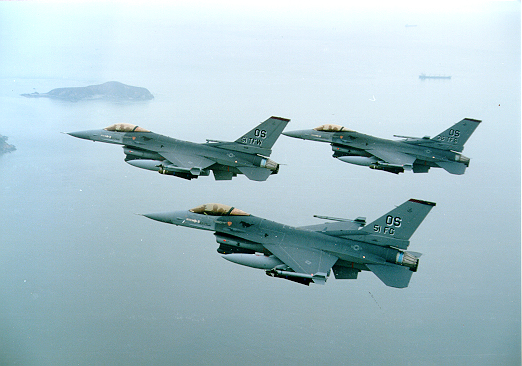
South Korea based 51st Fighter Wing F-16Cs in flight.

The post-Vietnam era found the command focusing on improving its readiness and PACAF's organizational structure saw a marked period of rapid and extensive changes. Inactivated at the end of the Vietnam War in 1975, Seventh Air Force was reactivated at Osan Air Base, South Korea in 1986 to take over Fifth Air Force activities in South Korea. Also in 1986, the Goldwater-Nichols Act reworked the overall command structure of the United States military. With the creation of Unified Combatant Commands (UCC) organized either on a geographical basis (known as "Area of Responsibility", AOR) or on a functional basis, Pacific Air Forces became a part of the United States Pacific Command (USPACOM).

Andersen AFB in Guam was reassigned from Strategic Air Command (SAC) to PACAF in 1989, and Eleventh Air Force became a part of the command in late 1990. In the late 1980s and early 1990s, civil unrest in the Philippines and negotiations with the extant government of the Republic of the Philippines for the lease of Clark Air Base, along with other U.S. military installations in the Philippines, had reached an impasse. However, following the volcanic eruption of Mount Pinatubo, the resultant damage to Clark AB, and with a post-Cold War desire by the U.S. Government to reduce defense spending, Clark AB was closed and Thirteenth Air Force relocated in 1991.

In 1992, changes took place in force structure within PACAF as the command assumed control of theater-based tactical airlift wings, theater C-130 aircraft and crews, and associated theater C-130 support following the disestablishment of Military Airlift Command (MAC). PACAF also gained control of all operational support aircraft and all aeromedical airlift assets in the Pacific previously under the cognizance of MAC. With the concurrent disestablishment of Strategic Air Command (SAC) and Tactical Air Command (TAC) the same year, PACAF also assumed responsibility for all active KC-135 aerial refueling aircraft based in Hawaii and Japan, "gaining command" responsibility for all Air National Guard KC-135 aircraft in Hawaii and Alaska, and all E-3 AWACS aircraft in Japan and Alaska.

Throughout its history PACAF has played a vital role in world events. In addition to its key combat role in World War II, Korea and Vietnam, PACAF units fought in Desert Storm in 1991 and continued to deploy to Saudi Arabia, Turkey and Italy for peacekeeping operations such as Operation Southern Watch and Operation Northern Watch. PACAF provided its expertise, aircraft, personnel and equipment to facilitate the new Expeditionary Air Force, especially as it applied to successful airbridge operations spanning the vast Pacific Ocean. Following the 11 September 2001 terrorist attacks on the United States, PACAF again demonstrated its intrepid spirit through its units deployed in support of Operation Noble Eagle, Operation Enduring Freedom and, in 2003, Operation Iraqi Freedom.

Since 1944, the command has also participated in more than 140 humanitarian operations within its area of responsibility and beyond. In these operations PACAF people quickly and efficiently airlifted food, medicine and other supplies to areas devastated by storms, floods, earthquakes, volcanoes and other natural disasters.

As PACAF entered the second decade of the 21st century, expanding theatre challenges and simultaneous resource constraints have forced continuing innovation and adjustments by PACAF in order to meet mission requirements. Previously assigned four numbered air forces, PACAF downscoped to three numbered air forces in September 2012, inactivating 13th Air Force and merging its functions into PACAF. Base consolidations and infrastructure limitations have also required the Air Force and PACAF to developed increased capability while striving to remain within budgetary resource constraints. One such example has been the evaluation of alternate runway(s)/divert field(s) in the Marianas since late 2011 as a backup to Andersen AFB on Guam, a process that remains on-going as of 2014. In 2023, The first Royal Australian Air Force Deputy Commander took up position alongside the USAF Command Chain.

=== Lineage ===
- Established as Far East Air Forces (Provisional) on 31 July 1944

Reestablished: Far East Air Forces on 3 August 1944
Activated on 3 August 1944
Redesignated: Pacific Air Command, United States Army, on 6 December 1945
Redesignated: Far East Air Forces on 1 January 1947
Redesignated Pacific Air Forces on 1 July 1957

=== Assignments ===
- Southwest Pacific Area, 3 August 1944
- US Army Forces, Pacific, 6 December 1945
- United States Air Force, 26 September 1947 – Present

=== Historical Operational Components ===
Commands

- Far East Air Forces Bomber Command, Provisional: 8 July 1950 – 18 June 1954
- Far East Air Forces Combat Cargo Command, Provisional: 20 August 1950 – 25 January 1951
- Far East (later, Pacific) Air Service Command, later Far East Air Materiel Command (from 1 January 1947) later, Far East Air Logistics Force): 18 August 1944 – 1 October 1955.

Force

- Japan Air Defense: 1 March 1952 – 1 September 1954

Air Forces

- Fifth Air Force

3 August 1944 – Present

- Seventh Air Force

14 July 1945 – 1 January 1947; 5 January 1955 – 1 July 1957; 1 April 1966 – 30 June 1975; 8 September 1986 – Present

- Eighth Air Force: 6 December 1945 – 7 June 1946
- Eleventh Air Force: 9 August 1990 – Present
- Thirteenth Air Force: 3 August 1944 – 1 June 1955; 1 July 1957 – 28 September 2012
- Twentieth Air Force: 6 December 1945 – 1 March 1955

Air Divisions

- 1st Bombardment Division (later: 1st Air Division): 7 June 1946 – 1 December 1948
- 2d Air Division: 10 September – 10 October 1962; 8 July 1965 – 1 April 1966
- 17th Air Division. 17 1 July 1975 – 1 January 1976
- 85th Air Division: 11 May 1945 – 1 September 1945
- 91st Air Division: 8 August 1944 – 27 January 1946
- 314th Air Division: 18 May 1951 – 1 March 1952
- 315th Air Division: 25 January 1951 – 15 April 1969
- 326th Air Division: 1 July 1957 – 15 February 1989
- 327th Air Division: 26 January – 8 February 1966

Wings

- 8th Tactical Fighter Wing: 18 June – 8 July 1964
- 18th Fighter Wing: 1 December 1948 – 16 May 1949
- 19th Bombardment Wing: 16 May – 17 October 1949
- 27th Fighter-Escort Wing: attached, 19–29 November 1950 and 6–13 October 1952
- 35th Tactical Fighter Wing: 14 March – 8 April 1966
- 322d Troop Carrier Wing: 30 December 1944 – 15 February 1946

=== Stations ===
- Brisbane, Australia, 3 August 1944
- Hollandia, New Guinea, 16 September 1944
- Leyte, Philippines, 7 February 1945
- Tolosa, Leyte, Philippines, 17 February 1945
- Fort William McKinley, Leyte, Philippines, 20 March 1945
- Tokyo, Japan, 17 May 1946
- Fuchu AS, Japan, 13 May 1956
- Hickam AFB, Hawaii, 30 June 1957 – Present
- Ching Chuan Kang Air Base, Taiwan, 8 January 1954 – April 1979

== Commanders, Pacific Air Forces ==
No.	Commander		Term		
No.	Portrait	Name	Took office	Left office	Term length
1	George C. Kenney	General; George C. Kenney	15 June 1944	29 December 1945	1 year, 197 days
2	Ennis Whitehead	Lieutenant General; Ennis Whitehead	30 December 1945	25 April 1949	3 years, 117 days
3	George E. Stratemeyer	Lieutenant General; George E. Stratemeyer	26 April 1949	9 June 1951	2 years, 44 days
4	Otto P. Weyland	Major General; Otto P. Weyland	10 June 1951	25 March 1954	2 years, 289 days
5	Earle E. Partridge	Major General; Earle E. Partridge	26 March 1954	31 May 1955	1 year, 66 days
6	Laurence S. Kuter	General; Laurence S. Kuter	1 June 1955	1 August 1959	2 years, 61 days
7	Emmett O'Donnell Jr.	General; Emmett O'Donnell Jr.	1 August 1959	1 August 1963	4 years
8	Jacob E. Smart	General; Jacob E. Smart	1 August 1963	1 August 1964	1 years
9	Hunter Harris Jr.	General; Hunter Harris Jr.	1 August 1964	1 February 1967	2 years, 184 days
10	John D. Ryan	General; John D. Ryan	1 February 1967	1 August 1968	1 year, 182 days
11	Joseph J. Nazzaro	General; Joseph J. Nazzaro	1 August 1968	1 August 1971	3 years
12	Lucius D. Clay Jr.	General; Lucius D. Clay Jr.	1 August 1971	1 October 1973	2 years, 61 days
13	John W. Vogt Jr.	General; John W. Vogt Jr.	1 October 1973	1 July 1974	273 days
14	Louis L. Wilson Jr.	General; Louis L. Wilson Jr.	1 July 1974	3 June 1977	3 years, 2 days
15	James A. Hill	Lieutenant General; James A. Hill	3 June 1977	15 June 1978	347 days
16	James D. Hughes	Lieutenant General; James D. Hughes	15 June 1978	8 June 1981	2 years, 358 days
17	Arnold W. Braswell	Lieutenant General; Arnold W. Braswell	8 June 1981	8 October 1983	2 years, 122 days
18	Jerome F. O'Malley	General; Jerome F. O'Malley	8 October 1983	25 September 1984	353 days
19	Robert W. Bazley	General; Robert W. Bazley	25 September 1984	16 December 1986	2 years, 82 days
20	Jack I. Gregory	General; Jack I. Gregory	16 December 1986	22 July 1988	1 year, 219 days
21	Merrill McPeak	General; Merrill McPeak	22 July 1988	5 November 1990	2 years, 106 days
22	Jimmie V. Adams	General; Jimmie V. Adams	19 February 1991	22 January 1993	1 year, 338 days
23	Robert L. Rutherford	General; Robert L. Rutherford	22 January 1993	12 October 1994	1 year, 263 days
24	John G. Lorber	General; John G. Lorber	12 October 1994	7 July 1997	2 years, 268 days
25	Richard B. Myers	General; Richard B. Myers	7 July 1997	23 July 1998	1 year, 16 days
26	Patrick K. Gamble	General; Patrick K. Gamble	23 July 1998	9 April 2001	2 years, 260 days
27	Lansford E. Trapp	Lieutenant General; Lansford E. Trapp; Acting	9 April 2001	4 May 2001	25 days
28	William J. Begert	General; William J. Begert	4 May 2001	2 July 2004	3 years, 59 days
29	Paul V. Hester	General; Paul V. Hester	2 July 2004	30 November 2007	3 years, 151 days
30	Carrol Chandler	General; Carrol Chandler	30 November 2007	19 August 2009	1 year, 262 days
31	Gary L. North	General; Gary L. North	19 August 2009	3 August 2012	2 years, 350 days
32	Herbert J. Carlisle	General; Herbert J. Carlisle	3 August 2012	16 October 2014	2 years, 74 days
33	Lori Robinson	General; Lori Robinson	16 October 2014	11 May 2016	1 year, 270 days
34	Russell J. Handy	Lieutenant General; Russell J. Handy; Acting	11 May 2016	12 July 2016	62 days
35	Terrence J. O'Shaughnessy	General; Terrence J. O'Shaughnessy	12 July 2016	24 May 2018	2 years, 14 days
36	Jerry P. Martinez	Lieutenant General; Jerry P. Martinez; Acting	24 May 2018	26 July 2018	63 days
37	Charles Q. Brown Jr.	General; Charles Q. Brown Jr.	26 July 2018	8 July 2020	1 year, 348 days
38	Kenneth S. Wilsbach	General; Kenneth S. Wilsbach	8 July 2020	9 February 2024	3 years, 216 days
39	Kevin B. Schneider	General; Kevin B. Schneider	9 February 2024	Incumbent	2 years, 232 days

== Component units ==
Pacific Air Forces comprises the following wings and major units.

- Headquarters Pacific Air Forces (Joint Base Pearl Harbor–Hickam, Hawaii)
  - 319th Expeditionary Reconnaissance Squadron, Kanoya Air Field, Japan, established October 2022 (UAVs).

=== Fifth Air Force ===
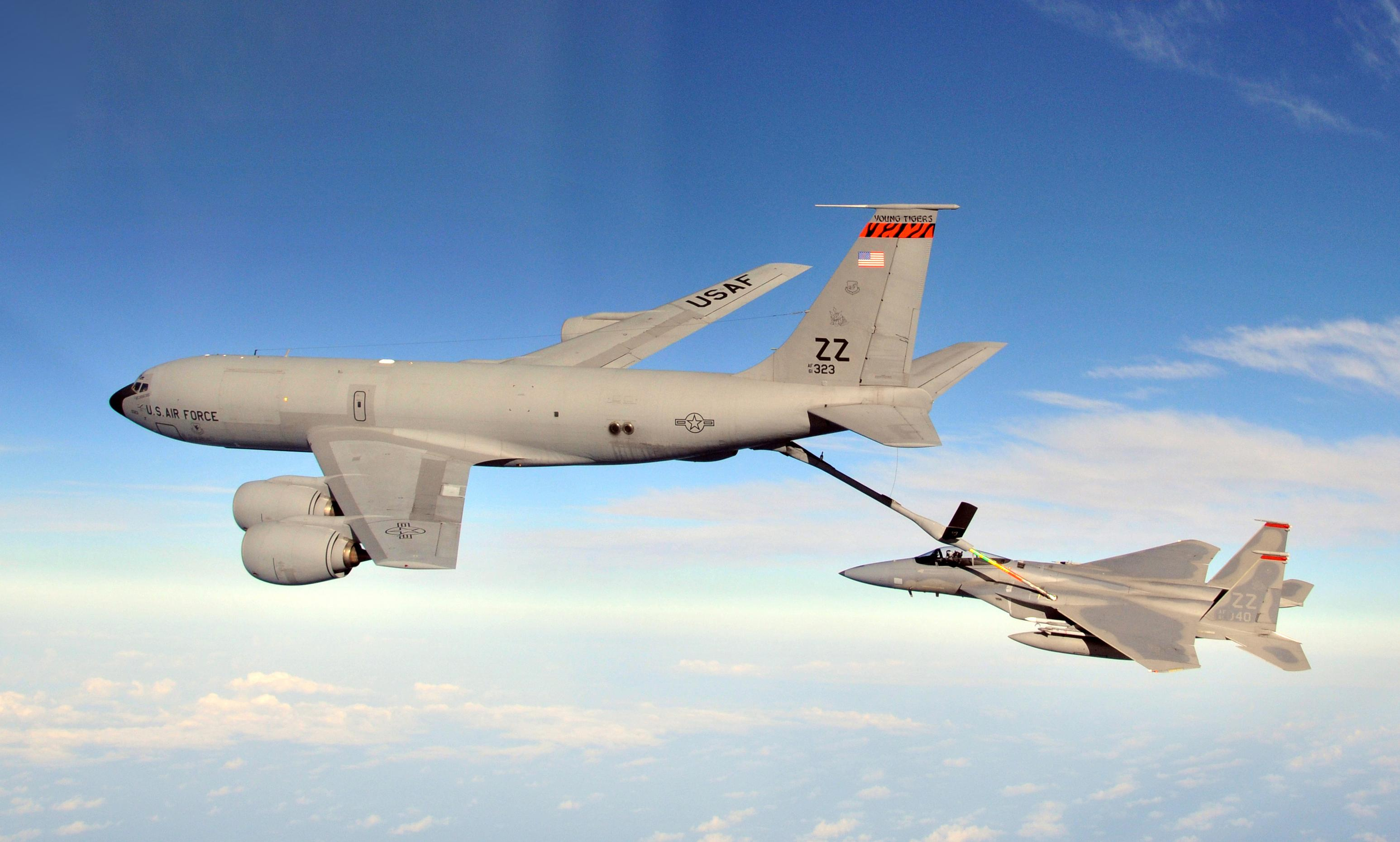
A F-15C Eagle is refueled by a KC-135R Stratotanker, both aircraft are from the 18th Wing based at Kadena Air Base, Japan.

The Fifth Air Force is responsible for USAF operations in Japan. Its role is to defend Japan, respond to regional events, and enhance the U.S. and Japan Mutual Defense Assistance Agreement alliance between the U.S. and Japan.

Permanent units

- Headquarters Fifth Air Force (Yokota Air Base, Japan)
- 18th Wing (Kadena Air Base, Japan) – E-3B/C Sentry, HH-60G Pave Hawk, F-15C/D Eagle, E-8C J-STARS and KC-135R Stratotanker
- 35th Fighter Wing (Misawa Air Base, Japan) – F-16CJ/DJ Fighting Falcon
- 374th Airlift Wing (Yokota Air Base) – C-12J Huron, C-130J Hercules and UH-1N Iroquois
- 605th Air Operations Group (Yokota Air Base)

=== Seventh Air Force (Air Forces Korea) ===
The Seventh Air Force contributes to maintaining the armistice between South Korea and North Korea.

Permanent units

- Headquarters Seventh Air Force (Osan Air Base, South Korea)
- 8th Fighter Wing (Kunsan Air Base South Korea) – F-16C/D Fighting Falcon
- 51st Fighter Wing (Osan Air Base) – A-10C Thunderbolt II and F-16C/D Fighting Falcon
- 607th Air and Space Operations Center (Osan Air Base)
- 607th Air Support Group (Osan Air Base)
- 607th Air Support Operations Group (Osan Air Base)
- 607th Support Group (Osan Air Base)

=== Eleventh Air Force ===
A F-22A Raptor of the 15th Wing taking off from Joint Base Pearl Harbor–Hickam.

The Eleventh Air Force is responsible for USAF operations across the Pacific, including the states of Alaska and Hawaii and the US territory of Guam.

Permanent units

- Headquarters 11th Air Force (Joint Base Elmendorf-Richardson, Alaska)
- 3rd Wing (Joint Base Elmendorf-Richardson) – C-130H Hercules, C-17A Globemaster III, F-22A Raptor and E-3B Sentry
- 15th Wing (Joint Base Pearl Harbor–Hickam, Hawaii) – C-17A Globemaster III, C-37B, C-40A, F-22A Raptor
- 36th Wing (Anderson AFB, Guam)
- 354th Fighter Wing (Eielson AFB, Alaska) – F-16C/D Fighting Falcon and F-35A Lightning II
- 611th Air and Space Operations Center (Joint Base Elmendorf-Richardson)
- 611th Air Support Group (Joint Base Elmendorf-Richardson)
- 613th Air and Space Operations Center (Joint Base Pearl Harbor–Hickam)
- 613th Support Group (Joint Base Pearl Harbor–Hickam)
- 673rd Air Base Wing (Joint Base Elmendorf-Richardson)
- Pacific Air Forces Regional Support Center (Joint Base Elmendorf-Richardson)

Expeditionary units

- 13th Air Expeditionary Group (Christchurch International Airport, New Zealand and McMurdo Station, Antarctica) – C-17A Globemaster III and LC-130 Hercules

=== Air Force Reserve ===
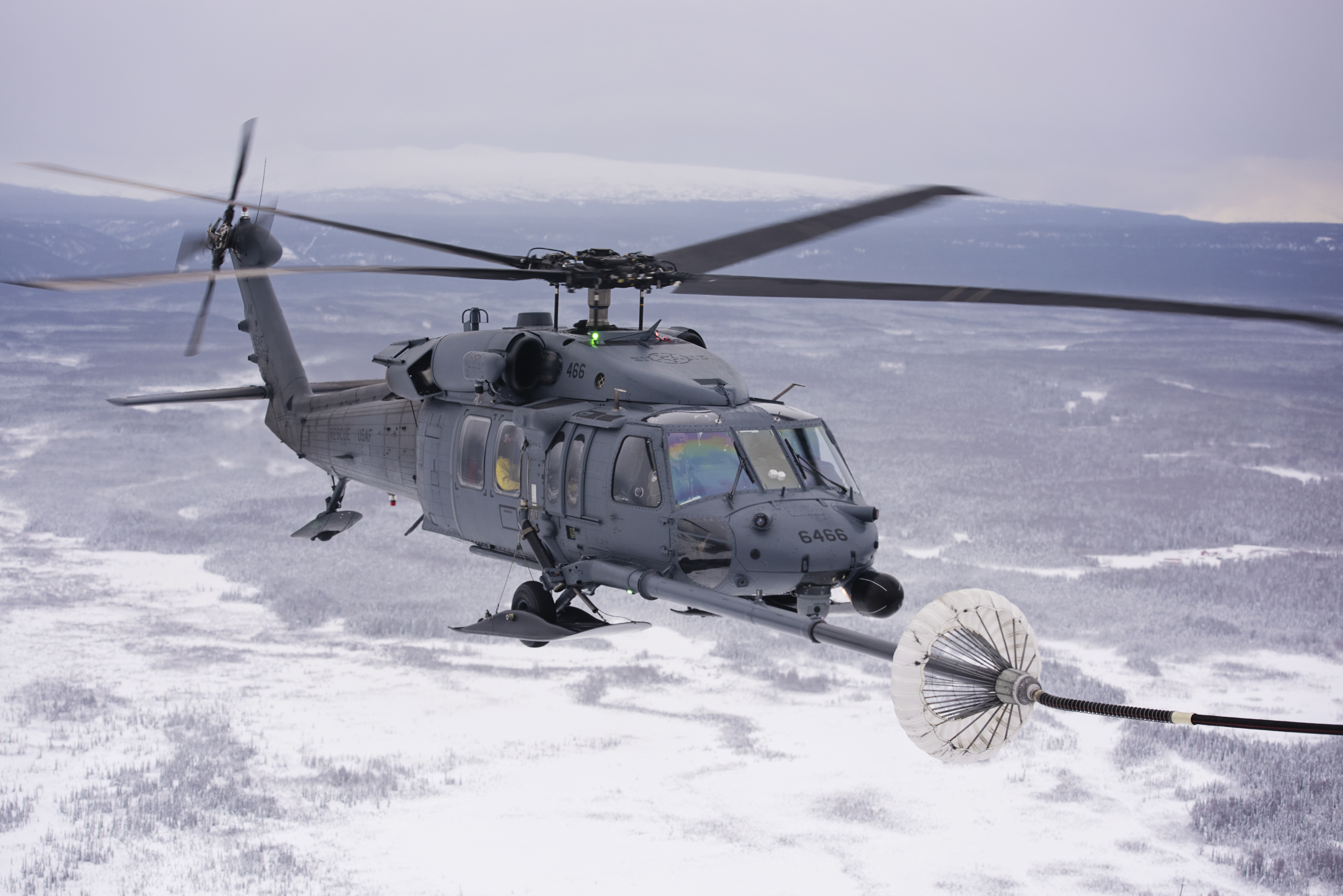
HH-60G Pave Hawk of the Alaska Air National Guard's 176th Wing is refuelled in-flight.

Pacific Air Forces has operational "gaining command" responsibility for several Air Reserve Component (ARC) units, comprising personnel and aircraft from Air Force Reserve Command (AFRC) and the Air National Guard (ANG).

Air Force Reserve Command

- 477th Fighter Group (Joint Base Elmendorf-Richardson) – F-22A Raptor
- 624th Regional Support Group (Joint Base Pearl Harbor–Hickam and Andersen AFB)
- 701st Combat Operations Squadron (March Air Reserve Base, California and Joint Base Pearl Harbor–Hickam)

Alaska Air National Guard

- 176th Wing (Joint Base Elmendorf-Richardson) – C-130H Hercules, C-17A Globemaster III, HC-130J Combat King II and HH-60G Pave Hawk
- 168th Air Refueling Wing (Eielson AFB) – KC-135R Stratotanker
- Alaska Rescue Coordination Center (Joint Base Elmendorf-Richardson)

Guam Air National Guard

- 254th Air Base Group (Andersen AFB)

Hawaii Air National Guard

- 109th Air Operations Group (Joint Base Pearl Harbor–Hickam)
- 154th Wing (Joint Base Pearl Harbor–Hickam) – C-17A Globemaster III, F-22A Raptor and KC-135R Stratotanker
- 201st Air Operations Group (Joint Base Pearl Harbor–Hickam)
- 298th Air Defense Group (Wheeler Army Airfield, Hawaii)

Missouri Air National Guard

- 157th Air Operations Group (Jefferson Barracks National Guard Base)

=== Other units ===
- USAF Band of the Pacific – Asia (Yokota Air Base)
- USAF Band of the Pacific – Hawaii (Joint Base Pearl Harbor–Hickam)

== See also ==
- Republic of Korea Armed Forces
- United States Air Force in South Korea
- United States Air Force in Thailand
- United States Army Air Forces in Australia
- United States Forces Korea (USFK)
- United States Taiwan Defense Command (USTDC)
