= Corey Martin =

U.S. Air Force general

Corey J. Martin
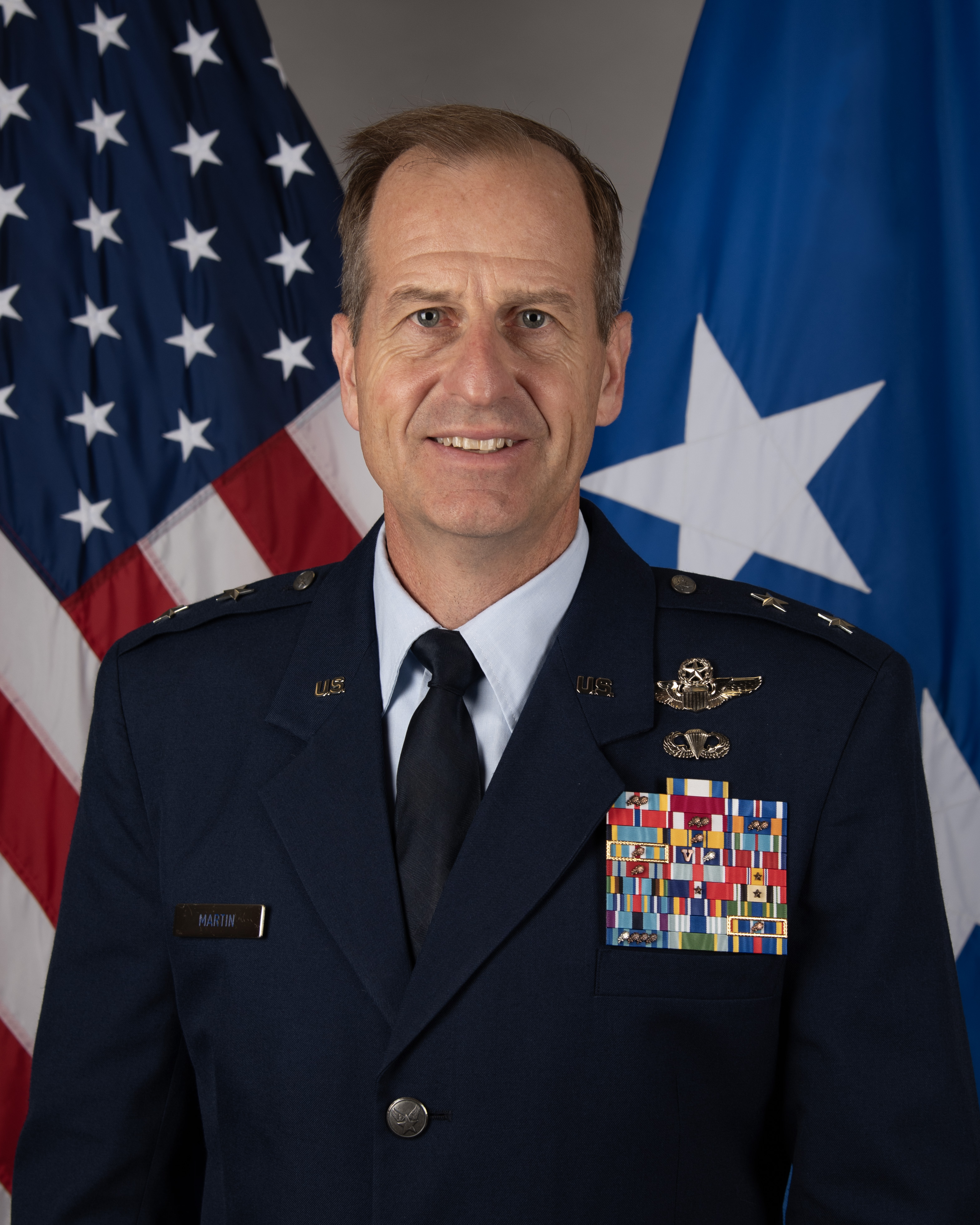
- Military career
- Allegiance: United States
- Branch: United States Air Force
- Service years: 1991–2024
- Rank: Major General
- Commands: Eighteenth Air Force; 60th Air Mobility Wing; 376th Air Expeditionary Wing; 447th Operations Support Squadron; 437th Operations Support Squadron
- Conflicts: Iraq War
- Awards: Defense Superior Service Medal (3); Legion of Merit; Distinguished Flying Cross; Bronze Star Medal

Corey J. Martin is a retired United States Air Force major general who served as commander of the Eighteenth Air Force from 2022 to 2024. He previously served as the director of operations of the United States Transportation Command from 2020 to 2022.

Military offices
Preceded by Dwight Sones	Commander of the 60th Air Mobility Wing; 2013–2015	Succeeded by Joel D. Jackson
Preceded by Ricky Rupp	Special Assistant to the Commander of the United Nations Command, ROK/US Combined Forces Command, and United States Forces Korea; 2015–2016	Succeeded by Dagvin Anderson
Preceded by Ricky Rupp	Senior Defense Official and Defense Attaché to Israel; 2017–2019	Succeeded by Charles E. Brown
Preceded by Darren V. James	Director of Operations, Strategic Deterrence, and Nuclear Integration of the Air Mobility Command; 2019–2020	Succeeded by Joel D. Jackson
Preceded by Brian S. Robinson	Director of Operations of the United States Transportation Command; 2020–2022	Succeeded by Laura Lenderman
Preceded by Kenneth Bibb	Commander of the Eighteenth Air Force; 2022–2024	Succeeded by Charles D. Bolton
