= Navy Information Operations Command, Hawaii =

U.S. Navy command

The Navy Information Operations Command (NIOC), Hawaii (previously: Naval Security Group Activity (NSGA) Hawaii, NSGA Kunia, and NSGA Pearl Harbor) is a United States naval installation located on the Hawaiian island of Oahu. NIOC Hawaii employs more than 2,000 service members and civilians in support of cyber operations and signals intelligence ("SIGINT"). It was originally formed on 30 September 2004, after the merging of NSGA Kunia and NSGA Pearl Harbor, and then known as the combined "NSGA Hawaii". NIOC Hawaii serves as a worldwide hub for a secure US and allied communications network. NIOC Hawaii also provides a secure radio relay, as well as support to the US Indo-Pacific Command ("USINDOPACOM") by providing cryptologic personnel, as well as information, communications, and engineering installation services. NIOC Hawaii provides host support services to the Regional Security Operations Center.

== US Marine detachment ==
A US Marine unit, Marine Cryptologic Support Battalion (formerly Marine Support Battalion) Company I, was co-located with NSGA Kunia, and still resides at Schofield Barracks.

== Naval Security Group merging ==
On 14 November 1980, one of the original parent commands, NSGA Kunia, was commissioned at what was then known as Wheeler Air Force Base (now Wheeler Army Airfield). On 30 September 2004, at a ceremony aboard the USS Nevada Memorial, NSGA Kunia and NSGA Pearl Harbor merged to form the new NSGA Hawaii. NSGA Hawaii itself, was subsequently decommissioned on 30 September 2005, then recommissioned the following day as the Navy Information Operations Command (NIOC Hawaii).

== See also ==
- Naval Security Group
