= Naval Security Group =

Disestablished Signal Intelligence unit of the U.S. Navy

The Naval Security Group (NAVSECGRU) was an organization within the United States Navy, tasked with intelligence gathering and denial of intelligence to adversaries. A large part of this is signals intelligence gathering, cryptology and information assurance. The NAVSECGRU organization was active from March 1935 to September 2005. For many years its headquarters was in what is now the Nebraska Avenue Complex in Washington DC.

In addition to being part of the Navy, NAVSECGRU was also part of the National Security Agency's Central Security Service.

The NAVSECGRU organization was transferred to the Naval Network Warfare Command (NETWARCOM) where its former assets made up the Information Operations Directorate. The service cryptologic commander role was transferred to United States Tenth Fleet 29 January 2010.
