= Jerry P. Martinez =

US Air Force officer (born c. 1964)

Lieutenant General Jerry P. Martinez
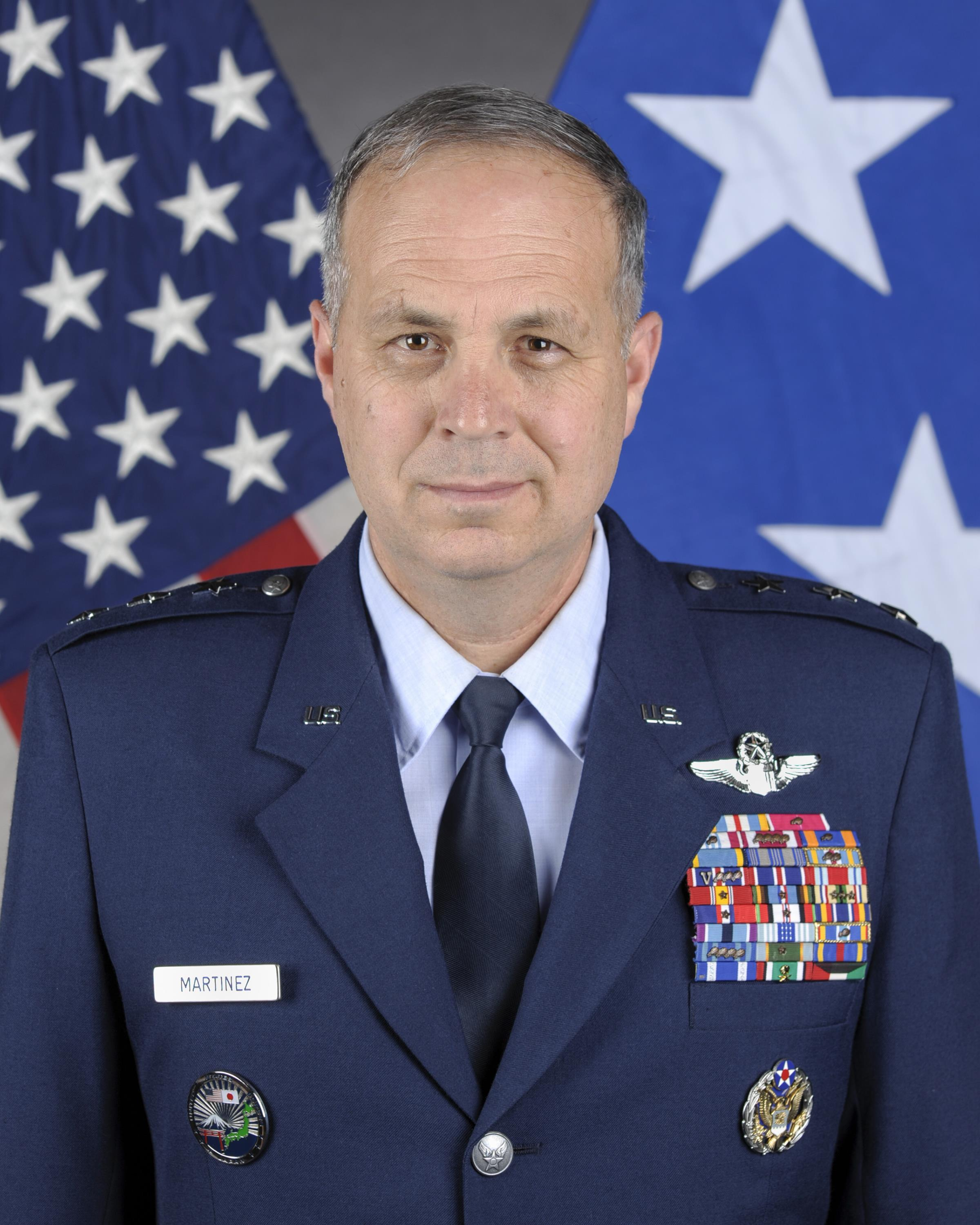
- Lieutenant General Jerry P. Martinez, USAF, c. 2016
- Born: c. 1964 (age 61–62)
- Alma mater: United States Air Force Academy (BS); Webster University (MA)
- Military career
- Allegiance: United States
- Branch: United States Air Force
- Service years: 1986–2019
- Rank: Lieutenant general
- Commands: United States Forces Japan; 5th Air Force; 62nd Airlift Wing
- Awards: Defense Distinguished Service Medal; Air Force Distinguished Service Medal (2); Defense Superior Service Medal; Legion of Merit (2); Defense Meritorious Service Medal (2); Meritorious Service Medal (5); Air Medal (2); Aerial Achievement Medal; Air Force Achievement Medal

Jerry P. Martinez (born 1964) is a retired United States Air Force lieutenant general who last served as commander of United States Forces Japan and commander of 5th Air Force from October 2016 to April 2019. During that assignment, he also served as interim commander of Pacific Air Forces from May 2018 to July 2018. Before this assignment, Martinez served as Director of Operations of Air Mobility Command from May 2015 to September 2016.

Martinez was commissioned in 1986 as a graduate of the U.S. Air Force Academy. He is a command pilot with more than 4,000 hours in the C-17A, C-5B, C-141B and KC-135R. Martinez commanded the 62nd Airlift Wing, the Air Force's only major nuclear airlift force. His staff assignments include deputy chief of staff operations, Headquarters Allied Joint Force Command, Brunssum, the Netherlands; chief of the Joint Mobility Operations Center at U.S. Transportation Command; Secretary of Defense Corporate Fellow with the DuPont Corporation in Wilmington, Delaware; and inspector general, Headquarters Air Mobility Command.

== Education ==
- 1986 Bachelor of Science, basic science, U.S. Air Force Academy, Colorado Springs, Colo.
- 1991 Squadron Officer School, Maxwell AFB, Ala.
- 1994 Master of Arts, business administration, Webster University, St. Louis, Mo.
- 1996 Army Command and General Staff College, Fort Leavenworth, Kan.
- 2001 Air War College, by seminar
- 2003 Secretary of Defense Corporate Fellow, DuPont Corporation, Wilmington, Del.
- 2005 Joint Forces Staff College, Norfolk, Va.

== Military assignments ==
1. June 1986 – January 1988, student, undergraduate pilot training, Vance AFB, Okla.
2. January 1988 – November 1993, KC-135 instructor pilot, chief of standardization and evaluation, and wing executive officer, Altus AFB, Okla.
3. November 1993 – June 1996, C-141 instructor pilot, flight commander and wing executive officer, Charleston AFB, S.C.
4. June 1996 – June 1997, student, Army Command and General Staff College, Fort Leavenworth, Kan.
5. June 1997 – March 1999, C-141/C-5 program element monitor, Deputy Chief of Staff for Plans and Operations, Headquarters U.S. Air Force, Arlington, Va.
6. March 1999 – July 2001, C-141 operations officer and commander of 4th Airlift Squadron, McChord AFB, Wash.
7. July 2001 – June 2003, chief of Mobility Systems Division, and chief of Joint Mobility Operations Center, U.S. Transportation Command, Scott AFB, Ill.
8. June 2003 – June 2004, Secretary of Defense Corporate Fellow, DuPont Corporation, Wilmington, Del.
9. June 2004 – June 2005, deputy commander of 436th Operations Group, Dover AFB, Del.
10. July 2005 – March 2006, vice commander of 22nd Air Refueling Wing, McConnell AFB, Kan.
11. March 2006 – January 2008, commander of 62nd Airlift Wing, McChord AFB, Wash.
12. January 2008 – September 2008, executive officer to the commander of Air Mobility Command, Scott AFB, Ill.
13. September 2008 – February 2010, inspector general, Headquarters Air Mobility Command, Scott AFB, Ill.
14. March 2010 – April 2011, deputy commander of political-military affairs, Combined Security Transition Command, Afghanistan, U.S. Central Command, Kabul, Afghanistan
15. April 2011 – June 2013, director for joint integration, Directorate of Operational Capability Requirements, Deputy Chief of Staff for Operations, Plans and Requirements, Headquarters U.S. Air Force, Arlington, Va.
16. June 2013 – May 2015, deputy chief of staff operations, Headquarters Allied Joint Force Command Brunssum, the Netherlands
17. May 2015 – September 2016, director of operations, Headquarters Air Mobility Command, Scott AFB, Ill.
18. October 2016 - April 2019, commander of United States Forces Japan and commander of 5th Air Force, Yokota AB, Japan. Also served as interim commander of Pacific Air Forces (May 2018 - July 2018).

== Effective dates of promotion ==
Insignia	Rank	Date of rank
	Second Lieutenant	May 28, 1986
	First Lieutenant	May 28, 1988
	Captain	May 28, 1990
	Major	August 1, 1996
	Lieutenant Colonel	July 1, 1999
	Colonel	July 1, 2005
	Brigadier General	December 3, 2009
	Major General	August 2, 2013
	Lieutenant General	October 6, 2016
