= John Lamontagne =

U.S. Air Force general

John D. Lamontagne
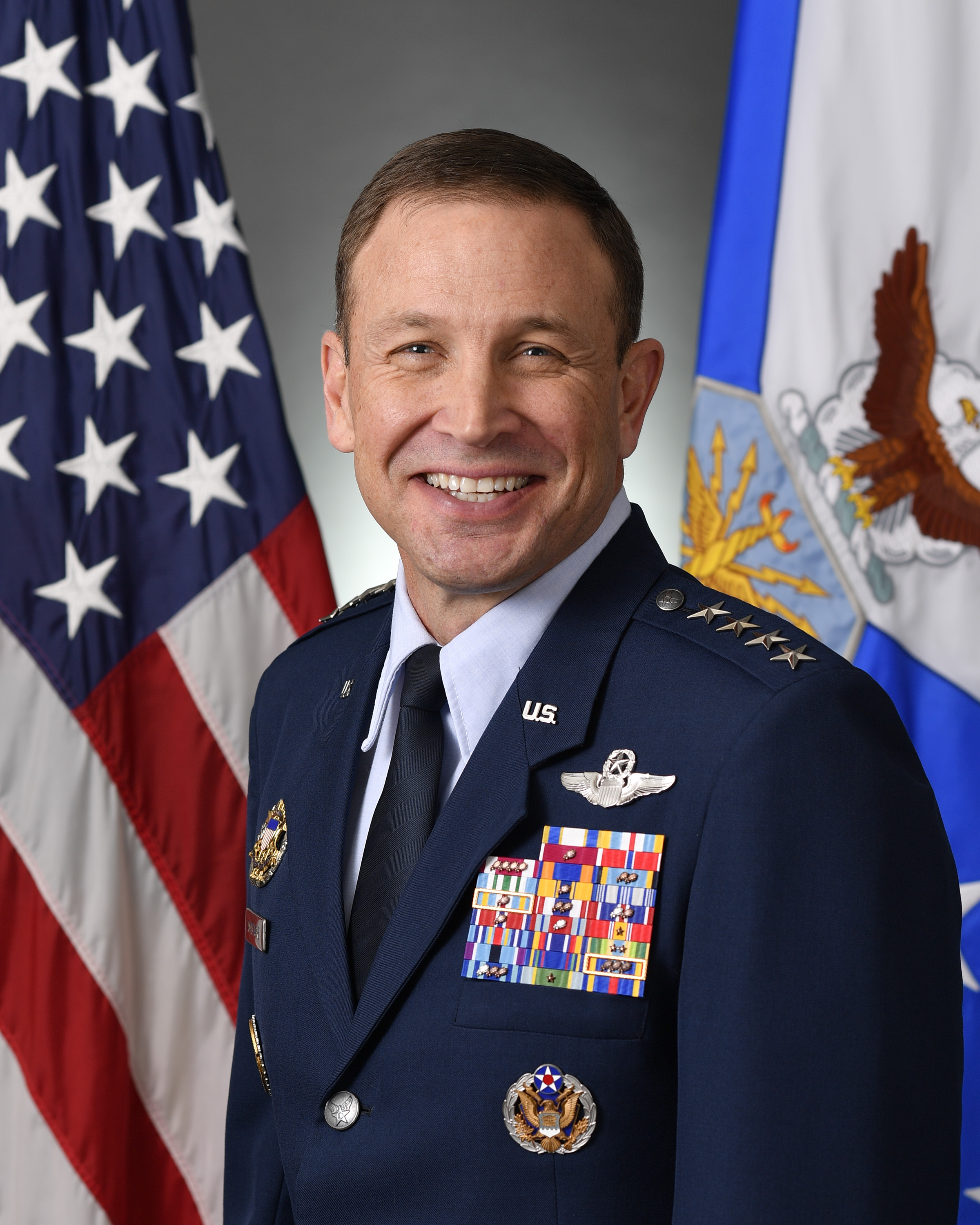
- Official portrait, 2026
- Born: c. 1970 (age 55–56)
- Military career
- Allegiance: United States
- Branch: United States Air Force
- Service years: 1992–present
- Rank: General
- Nickname: Johnny
- Commands: Vice Chief of Staff of the Air Force; Air Mobility Command; 618th Air Operations Center; 437th Airlift Wing; 379th Expeditionary Operations Group; 15th Airlift Squadron
- Awards: Defense Superior Service Medal (2); Legion of Merit (2); Bronze Star Medal

John Donald Lamontagne (born c. 1970) is a United States Air Force general who has served as the 42nd vice chief of staff of the Air Force since 9 February 2026. He previously served as the commander of Air Mobility Command from 2024 to 2026. He most recently served as the deputy commander of the United States Air Forces in Europe – Air Forces Africa. He previously served as the chief of staff of the United States European Command.

In July 2024, Lamontagne was nominated for promotion to general and assignment as the commander of Air Mobility Command. Following his confirmation, he took over command from Mike Minihan on 9 September 2024.

In December 2025, Lamontagne was nominated for reassignment as the vice chief of staff of the Air Force.

Lamontagne joined the Air Force in 1992 and has over 4,000 hours of flight in C-12, KC-135R and C-17 aircraft.

== Awards and decorations ==

USAF Command Pilot wings
U.S Air Force Distinguished Service Medal
Defense Superior Service Medal	Legion of Merit with bronze oak leaf cluster	Bronze Star Medal
Meritorious Service Medal with four bronze oak leaf clusters	Air Medal	Aerial Achievement Medal with two bronze oak leaf clusters
Joint Service Commendation Medal	Air and Space Commendation Medal with bronze oak leaf cluster	Air Force Achievement Medal
Joint Meritorious Unit Award with oak leaf cluster	Air Force Meritorious Unit with two bronze oak leaf clusters	Air and Space Outstanding Unit Award with six oak leaf clusters
Air and Space Organizational Excellence Award with bronze oak leaf cluster	Combat Readiness Medal with silver oak leaf cluster	National Defense Service Medal with bronze service star
Global War on Terrorism Expeditionary Medal	Global War on Terrorism Service Medal	Armed Forces Service Medal with two bronze service stars
Humanitarian Service Medal	Nuclear Deterrence Operations Service Medal	Air and Space Expeditionary Service Ribbon with gold frame and three bronze oak leaf clusters
Air and Space Longevity Service Award w/ 1 silver oak leaf cluster and 2 bronze oak leaf clusters	Small Arms Expert Marksmanship Ribbon with bronze service star	Air Force Training Ribbon
Headquarters Air Force Badge
Office of the Secretary of Defense Identification Badge

Military offices
Preceded by Mike Minihan	Commander of Air Mobility Command; 2024–2026	Succeeded by Rebecca Sonkiss; Acting
Preceded by James C. Slife	Vice Chief of Staff of the United States Air Force; 2026–present	Incumbent
