= Air Mobility Command =

Major command of the U.S. Air Force

- Shield of Air Mobility Command
- Active: 29 May 1941 – present (85 years, 3 months) Detailed: 1 June 1992 – present (as Air Mobility Command) 1 January 1966 – 1 June 1992 (as Military Airlift Command) 1 June 1948 – 1 January 1966 (as Military Air Transport Service) 1 July 1942 – 1 June 1948 (Air Transport Command) 9 March 1942 – 1 July 1942 (as Army Air Forces Ferrying Command) 29 May 1941 – 8 March 1942 (as Air Corps Ferrying Command)
- Country: United States
- Branch: + United States Air Force (18 September 1947 – Present): United States Army ( Army Air Forces (8 March 1942 – 18 September 1947); Army Air Corps (29 March 1941 – 9 March 1942)
- Type: Major Command
- Role: "AMC provides unrivaled airlift, air refueling, aeromedical evacuation, global air mobility support, and global command and control to project, connect, maneuver, and sustain the Joint Force (JF) in support of national objectives. Right Effects, Right Place, Right Time!"
- Size: 48,594 airmen 430 aircraft
- Part of: U.S. Transportation Command
- Headquarters: Scott Air Force Base, Illinois, U.S.
- Nickname: "reach" (callsign used)
- Motto: "We answer the call of others... so that they may prevail."
- Engagements: World War II – American Theater Global war on terrorism

- Decorations: Air Force Organization Excellence Award
- Website: www.amc.af.mil

Commanders
- Commander: Lt Gen Daniel H. Tulley
- Deputy Commander: Maj Gen Gerald A. Donohue (interim)
- Command Chief: CMSgt Raun M. Howell

Aircraft flown
- Transport: C-5, C-17A, C-20B/C, C-32A, C-37A, C-37B, C-21, C-40B, C-130H, LC-130H, C-130J, WC-130J, VC-25A
- Tanker: KC-135R/T, KC-46A

The Air Mobility Command (AMC) is a major command (MAJCOM) of the U.S. Air Force. It is headquartered at Scott Air Force Base, Illinois, east of St. Louis, Missouri, near Mascoutah, Illinois.

Air Mobility Command was established on 1 June 1992 and was formed from elements of the inactivated Military Airlift Command (MAC) and Strategic Air Command (SAC). AMC melded MAC's worldwide airlift system of primarily C-5 Galaxy, C-141 Starlifter (later replaced by C-17 Globemaster III beginning in 1995), and C-130 Hercules airlift aircraft with SAC's tanker force of KC-135 Stratotanker and KC-10 Extender aerial refueling aircraft, the latter air refueling aircraft having been freed from their strategic nuclear strike commitment to SAC's B-52 Stratofortress and B-1 Lancer bomber fleet by the end of the Cold War and the dissolution of the Soviet Union. In 2016, the Air Force Historical Research Agency consolidated the histories of AMC and MAC, extending AMC's lineage back to 1941.

== Overview ==
Air Mobility Command's mission is to provide global air mobility. The command also plays a crucial role in providing humanitarian support at home and around the world. AMC Airmen – active duty, Air National Guard, and Air Force Reserve, augmented by the civilian airliners and flight crews of the Civil Reserve Air Fleet (CRAF) – provide airlift and aerial refueling for all of the United States armed forces. Many special duty and operational support aircraft (OSA) and stateside aeromedical evacuation missions are also assigned to AMC.

U.S. forces must provide a rapid, tailored response that can intervene against a well-equipped foe, hit hard, and terminate quickly. Rapid global mobility lies at the heart of U.S. strategy in this environment. Without the capability to project forces, there is no conventional deterrent. As the number of U.S. forces stationed overseas continues to decline, global interests remain, making the capabilities AMC can provide even more in demand.

Air Mobility Command also has the mission of establishing bare air bases in contingencies. To accomplish this mission, AMC established two Contingency Response Wings, and operates the Eagle Flag exercise.

In addition to its status as a MAJCOM of the Air Force, AMC is also the Air Force component command of the United States Transportation Command (USTRANSCOM). It provides airlift, special missions, aerial refueling, and aeromedical evacuation for the United States armed forces. It also provides alert aerial refueling aircraft to the United States Strategic Command, and is a provider of theater airlift, aerial refueling, and aeromedical evacuation forces to the regional Unified Combatant Commands. AMC also operates VIP flights such as Air Force One, Air Force Two, and other Special Assignment Airlift Missions (SAAM). Finally, AMC acts as the single manager, on behalf of United States Transportation Command (USTRANSCOM), for Military Space Available Travel.

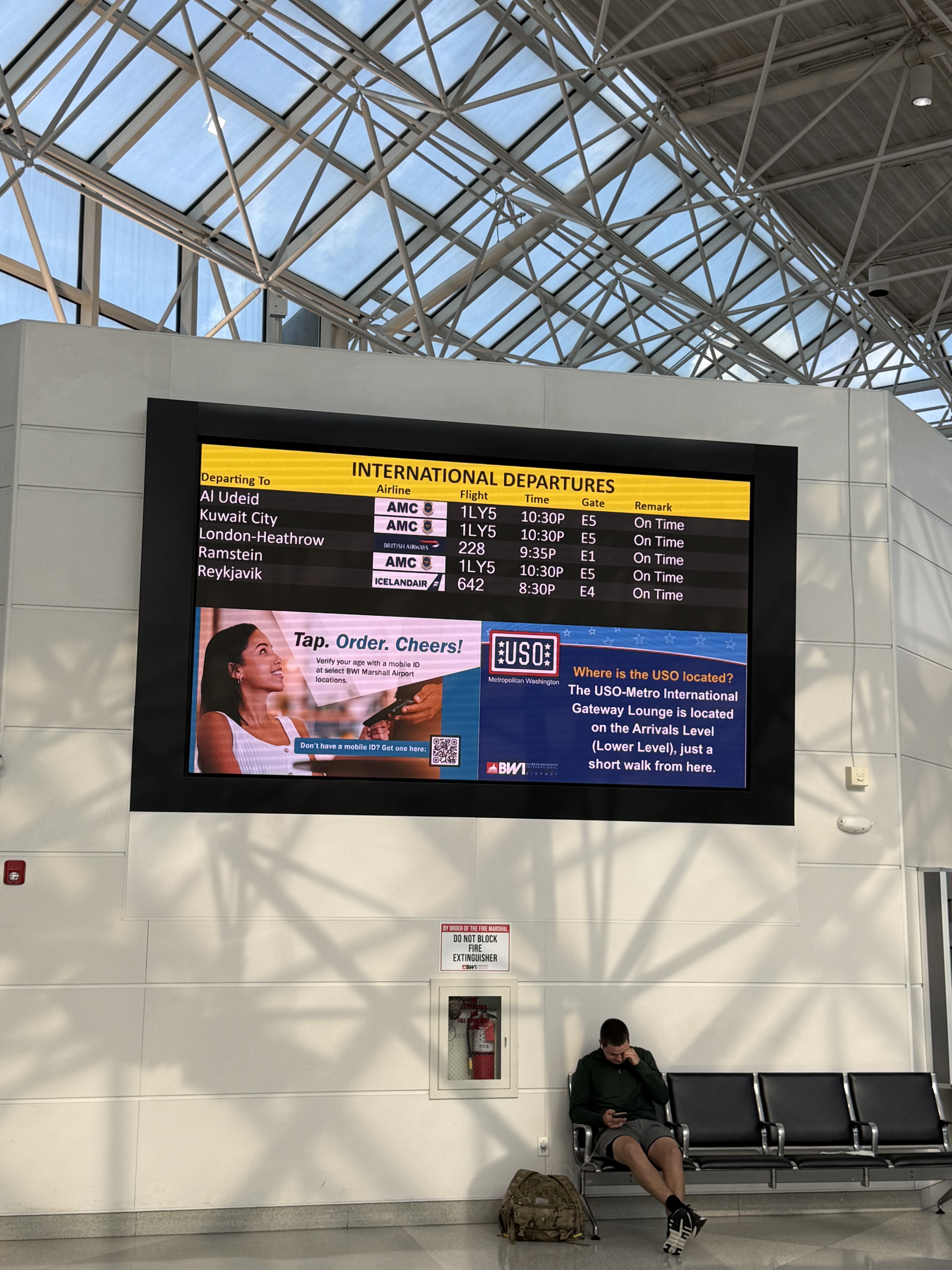
Departure board at AMC BWI Terminal

Principal aircraft assets of the command include: C-17 Globemaster III, C-5 Galaxy, C-130 Hercules, KC-135 Stratotanker, C-40 Clipper, C-37 Gulfstream V, and the C-21 Learjet. As of 2022, the command continues to integrate the KC-46 Pegasus within air refueling wings and air mobility wings in both the Active Component and the Air Reserve Component (ARC, i.e., the Air Force Reserve Command and the Air National Guard). In 2024, AMC retired the final KC-10 Extender from its inventory.

AMC also operates and maintains additional aircraft in support of high-profile VIP airlift include: VC-25, C-32, C-20G, C-20H, C-37 and the C-38, with the majority of that mission conducted by AMC's 89th Airlift Wing.

Additional long-range airlift aircraft are available during national emergencies through the Civil Reserve Air Fleet (CRAF), a fleet of civilian commercial aircraft committed to support the transportation of military forces and material in times of crisis.

== AMC wings and groups ==
The Air Mobility Command consists of the following active duty units:

Air Operations Centers

- 618th Air Operations Center (Tanker Airlift Control Center) at Scott AFB, Illinois

Numbered Air Forces

Eighteenth Air Force (18 AF)
Twenty-First Air Force (21 AF)

- Air Mobility Wings

60th Air Mobility Wing (C-5, C-17, KC-46A) at Travis AFB, California
305th Air Mobility Wing (C-17, KC-46A) at Joint Base McGuire-Dix-Lakehurst (McGuire AFB), New Jersey
375th Air Mobility Wing (C-21, Total Force integration aircrews for the C-40, KC-135) at Scott AFB, Illinois

- Airlift Wings

19th Airlift Wing (C-130J) at Little Rock AFB, Arkansas
62nd Airlift Wing (C-17) at Joint Base Lewis-McChord (McChord AFB), Washington
89th Airlift Wing (C-20, C-32, C-37, C-40, VC-25) at Joint Base Andrews (Andrews AFB), Maryland
317th Airlift Wing (C-130J) at Dyess AFB, Texas
436th Airlift Wing (C-5, C-17) at Dover AFB, Delaware
437th Airlift Wing (C-17) at Joint Base Lindsey Graham (Charleston AFB), South Carolina

- Air Refueling Wings

6th Air Refueling Wing (KC-135) at MacDill Air Force Base, Florida
22d Air Refueling Wing (KC-135, KC-46) at McConnell AFB, Kansas
92d Air Refueling Wing (KC-135) at Fairchild AFB, Washington

- Bands

USAF Band of Mid-America
USAF Band of the Golden West

- Museums

Air Mobility Command Museum at Dover AFB, Delaware
McChord Museum at Joint Base Lewis-McChord (McChord AFB), Washington
Travis Museum at Travis AFB, California

- Direct reporting units

United States Air Force Expeditionary Center at Joint Base McGuire-Dix-Lakehurst (McGuire AFB), New Jersey

- Air Base Wings and Groups

87th Air Base Wing at Joint Base McGuire-Dix-Lakehurst (McGuire AFB), New Jersey
627th Air Base Group at Joint Base Lewis-McChord (McChord AFB), Washington
628th Air Base Wing at Joint Base Lindsey Graham (Charleston AFB), South Carolina*

- Air Mobility Operations Wings and Groups and Contingency Response Wings
  - 43d Air Mobility Operations Group at Pope Field (former Pope AFB), North Carolina
  - 515th Air Mobility Operations Wing at Joint Base Pearl Harbor–Hickam (Hickam AFB), Hawaii
  - 521st Air Mobility Operations Wing at Ramstein Air Base, Germany
  - 621st Contingency Response Wing at Joint Base McGuire-Dix-Lakehurst (McGuire AFB), New Jersey

=== AFRC and ANG wings and groups operationally-gained by AMC ===
In addition to the active duty AMC units, numerous Air Force Reserve Command (AFRC) and Air National Guard (ANG) units equipped with C-5, C-17, C-21, C-38, C-40, C-130, LC-130, WC-130, KC-135 and KC-46 aircraft are "operationally gained" by AMC. These units train and exercise frequently and routinely provide augmentative operational support to AMC's active duty forces. AFRC units, when mobilized to active duty, and ANG units, when mobilized to federal service and active duty, may be deployed overseas as part of AMC in Air Expeditionary Groups and Wings as directed by HQ AMC.

- Air Force Reserve Command (AFRC) units

Fourth Air Force (4 AF) – March ARB, California (Air Force Reserve C-5, C-17, C-40, KC-135 units)

- 315th Airlift Wing, Joint Base Lindsey Graham, South Carolina

C-17 Globemaster III

- 349th Air Mobility Wing, Travis AFB, California

C-5 Galaxy, C-17 Globemaster III

- 433d Airlift Wing, Lackland AFB, Texas

C-5 Galaxy

- 434th Air Refueling Wing, Grissom ARB, Indiana

KC-135 Stratotanker

- 439th Airlift Wing, Westover ARB, Massachusetts

C-5 Galaxy

- 445th Airlift Wing, Wright-Patterson AFB, Ohio

C-17 Globemaster III

- 446th Airlift Wing, McChord AFB, Washington

C-17 Globemaster III

- 452d Air Mobility Wing, March ARB, California

C-17 Globemaster III, KC-135R Stratotanker

- 459th Air Refueling Wing, Andrews AFB, Maryland

KC-135 Stratotanker

- 507th Air Refueling Wing, Tinker AFB, Oklahoma

KC-135 Stratotanker

- 512th Airlift Wing, Dover AFB, Delaware

C-5 Galaxy, C-17 Globemaster III

- 514th Air Mobility Wing, McGuire AFB, Joint Base McGuire-Dix-Lakehurst, New Jersey

C-17 Globemaster III

- 911th Airlift Wing, Pittsburgh IAP Air Reserve Station, Pennsylvania

C-17 Globemaster III

- 914th Air Refueling Wing, Niagara Falls ARS, New York

KC-135 Stratotanker

- 916th Air Refueling Wing, Seymour Johnson AFB, North Carolina

KC-46 Pegasus

- 927th Air Refueling Wing, MacDill AFB, Florida

KC-135 Stratotanker

- 931st Air Refueling Wing, McConnell AFB, Kansas

KC-135 Stratotanker

- 940th Air Refueling Wing, Beale AFB, California

KC-135 Stratotanker

Twenty-Second Air Force (22 AF) – Dobbins ARB, Georgia (Air Force Reserve C-130 and WC-130 units)

- 94th Airlift Wing (C-130H Hercules)

Dobbins Air Reserve Base, Georgia

- 302d Airlift Wing (C-130H Hercules)

Peterson Air Force Base, Colorado

- 403d Wing (C-130J and WC-130J Super Hercules)

Keesler Air Force Base, Mississippi

- 908th Flying Training Wing (MH-139A Grey Wolf)

Maxwell Air Force Base, Alabama

- 932d Airlift Wing, Scott AFB, Illinois

C-40 Clipper

NOTE: 908 AW transitioning missions; extant C-130H aircraft transferred Apr 2022

- 910th Airlift Wing (C-130H Hercules)

Youngstown-Warren Air Reserve Station, Ohio

- 913th Airlift Group (C-130H Hercules)

Little Rock Air Force Base, Arkansas

- 934th Airlift Wing (C-130H Hercules)

Minneapolis-St Paul Joint Air Reserve Station, Minnesota

- Air National Guard (ANG) units

ANG air mobility units currently operate the C-21, C-17, C-38, C-40, C-130, LC-130 and KC-135, but are not assigned to a particular Numbered Air Force in the Air National Guard. Instead, they report to AMC via the National Guard Bureau (NGB).

- 101st Air Refueling Wing, Bangor Air National Guard Base, Maine

KC-135 Stratotanker

- 103d Airlift Wing, Bradley International Airport, Connecticut

C-130H Hercules

- 105th Airlift Wing, Stewart Air National Guard Base, New York

C-17 Globemaster III

- 108th Air Refueling Wing, McGuire AFB, Joint Base McGuire-Dix-Lakehurst, New Jersey

KC-135 Stratotanker

- 109th Airlift Wing, Stratton Air National Guard Base, New York

C-130H Hercules and LC-130H Hercules

- 113th Wing, Joint Base Andrews, District of Columbia

C-38 Courier, C-40 Clipper

NOTE: Composite wing with F-16 fighter & C-38/C-40 airlift aircraft. F-16 assets gained by ACC; C-38/C-40 assets gained by AMC.

- 117th Air Refueling Wing, Sumpter Smith Air National Guard Base, Alabama

KC-135 Stratotanker

- 120th Airlift Wing, Great Falls Air National Guard Base, Montana

C-130H Hercules

- 121st Air Refueling Wing, Rickenbacker Air National Guard Base, Ohio

KC-135 Stratotanker

- 123d Airlift Wing, Louisville Air National Guard Base, Kentucky

C-130J Super Hercules

- 126th Air Refueling Wing, Scott AFB, Illinois

KC-135 Stratotanker

- 127th Wing, Selfridge Air National Guard Base, Michigan

KC-135 Stratotanker

NOTE: Composite wing with A-10 fighter and KC-135 aerial refueling aircraft. A-10 assets gained by ACC; KC-135 assets gained by AMC.

- 128th Air Refueling Wing, General Mitchell Air National Guard Base, Wisconsin

KC-135 Stratotanker

- 130th Airlift Wing, McLaughlin Air National Guard Base, West Virginia

C-130J Super Hercules

- 133d Airlift Wing, Minneapolis–Saint Paul Joint Air Reserve Station, Minnesota

C-130H Hercules

- 134th Air Refueling Wing, McGhee Tyson Air National Guard Base, Tennessee

KC-135 Stratotanker

- 136th Airlift Wing, Naval Air Station Joint Reserve Base Fort Worth, Texas

C-130J Super Hercules

- 139th Airlift Wing, Rosecrans Air National Guard Base, Missouri

C-130H Hercules

- 140th Wing, Buckley Space Force Base, Colorado

C-21 Learjet

NOTE: Composite wing with F-16 fighter and C-21 airlift aircraft. F-16 assets gained by ACC; C-21 assets gained by AMC.

- 141st Air Refueling Wing, Fairchild AFB, Washington

KC-135 Stratotanker

- 143d Airlift Wing, Quonset Air National Guard Base, Rhode Island

C-130J Super Hercules

- 145th Airlift Wing, Charlotte Air National Guard Base, North Carolina

C-17 Globemaster

- 146th Airlift Wing, Channel Islands Air National Guard Station, California

C-130J Super Hercules

- 151st Air Refueling Wing, Roland R. Wright Air National Guard Base, Utah

KC-135 Stratotanker

- 152d Airlift Wing, Reno Air National Guard Base, Nevada

C-130H Hercules

- 153d Airlift Wing, Cheyenne Air National Guard Base, Wyoming

C-130H Hercules

- 155th Air Refueling Wing, Lincoln Air National Guard Base, Nebraska

KC-135 Stratotanker

- 156th Wing, Muñiz Air National Guard Base, Puerto Rico

NOTE: As of 2018, transitioned from a C-130E airlift wing to a non-flying contingency response wing mission

- 157th Air Refueling Wing, Pease Air National Guard Base, New Hampshire

KC-46 Pegasus

- 161st Air Refueling Wing, Goldwater Air National Guard Base, Arizona

KC-135 Stratotanker

- 164th Airlift Wing, Memphis Air National Guard Base, Tennessee

C-17 Globemaster III

- 165th Airlift Wing, Savannah Air National Guard Base (Travis Field), Georgia

C-130J Super Hercules

- 166th Airlift Wing, New Castle Air National Guard Base, Delaware

C-130H Hercules

- 167th Airlift Wing, Shepherd Field Air National Guard Base, West Virginia

C-17 Globemaster III

- 171st Air Refueling Wing, Pittsburgh Air National Guard Base, Pennsylvania

KC-135 Stratotanker

- 172d Airlift Wing, Jackson-Evers International Airport, Mississippi

C-17 Globemaster III

- 182d Airlift Wing, Peoria Air National Guard Base, Illinois

C-130H Hercules

- 185th Air Refueling Wing, Sioux City Air National Guard Base (Colonel Bud Day Field), Iowa

KC-135 Stratotanker

- 186th Air Refueling Wing, Key Field Air National Guard Base, Mississippi

KC-135 Stratotanker

- 189th Airlift Wing, Little Rock Air Force Base, Arkansas

C-130H Hercules

- 190th Air Refueling Wing, Forbes Field Air National Guard Base, Kansas

KC-135 Stratotanker

- Civil Reserve Air Fleet

== Operations ==
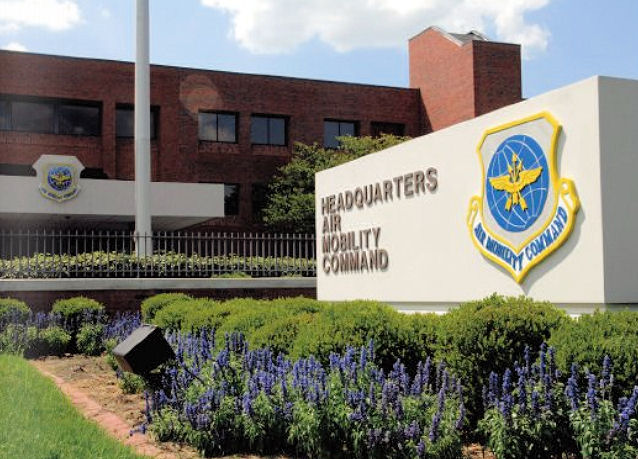
Air Mobility Command Headquarters building, Scott Air Force Base, Illinois

AMC has undergone considerable change since its establishment.

Focusing on the core mission of strategic air mobility, the command divested itself of infrastructure and forces not directly related to Global Reach. Divestments included the former Air Rescue Service, the Air Force Rescue Coordination Center (AFRCC), intratheater aeromedical airlift forces based overseas, and much of the operational support airlift fleet. Most of these activities were transferred to other commands, such as Air Combat Command (ACC). ACC would later inactivate the Air Rescue Service while continuing to maintain the AFRCC under 1st Air Force.

However, all KC-10 Extender and most KC-135 Stratotanker air refueling aircraft initially assigned to Air Combat Command following the disestablishment of Strategic Air Command (SAC) were transferred to AMC, along with Grand Forks AFB, McConnell AFB and Fairchild AFB.

As a result of the global war on terrorism, on 1 October 2003, AMC underwent a major restructuring, bringing a war fighting role to its numbered air force. AMC reactivated Eighteenth Air Force (18 AF) and established it as its main war fighting force. As subordinate components of 18 AF, AMC redesignated its two former numbered air forces as Expeditionary Mobility Task Forces (EMTF). Fifteenth Air Force was redesignated as the Fifteenth Air Force (15 EMTF), headquartered at Travis AFB, and Twenty-First Air Force was redesignated as the Twenty-First Air Force (21 EMTF), headquartered at McGuire AFB.

AMC's ability to provide global reach is tested daily. From providing fuel, supplies and aeromedical support to troops on the frontline of the Global War on Terrorism, to providing humanitarian supplies to hurricane, flood, and earthquake victims both at home and abroad, AMC has been engaged in almost nonstop operations since its inception. Command tankers and airlifters have supported peacekeeping and humanitarian efforts in Afghanistan, Bosnia, Iraq, Cambodia, Somalia, Rwanda and Haiti, and continue to play a vital role in the ongoing Global War on Terrorism. The USAF believes that air mobility is a national asset of growing importance for responding to emergencies and protecting national interests around the globe.

AMC coordinates wildlife management on overseas runways between several agencies, including deployments in southwest Asia. Where necessary AMC cooperates outside the DOD such as with the United States Department of Agriculture (USDA). This includes obtaining USDA bird netting solutions to fill the military's need for bird strike defense.

== Aircraft ==
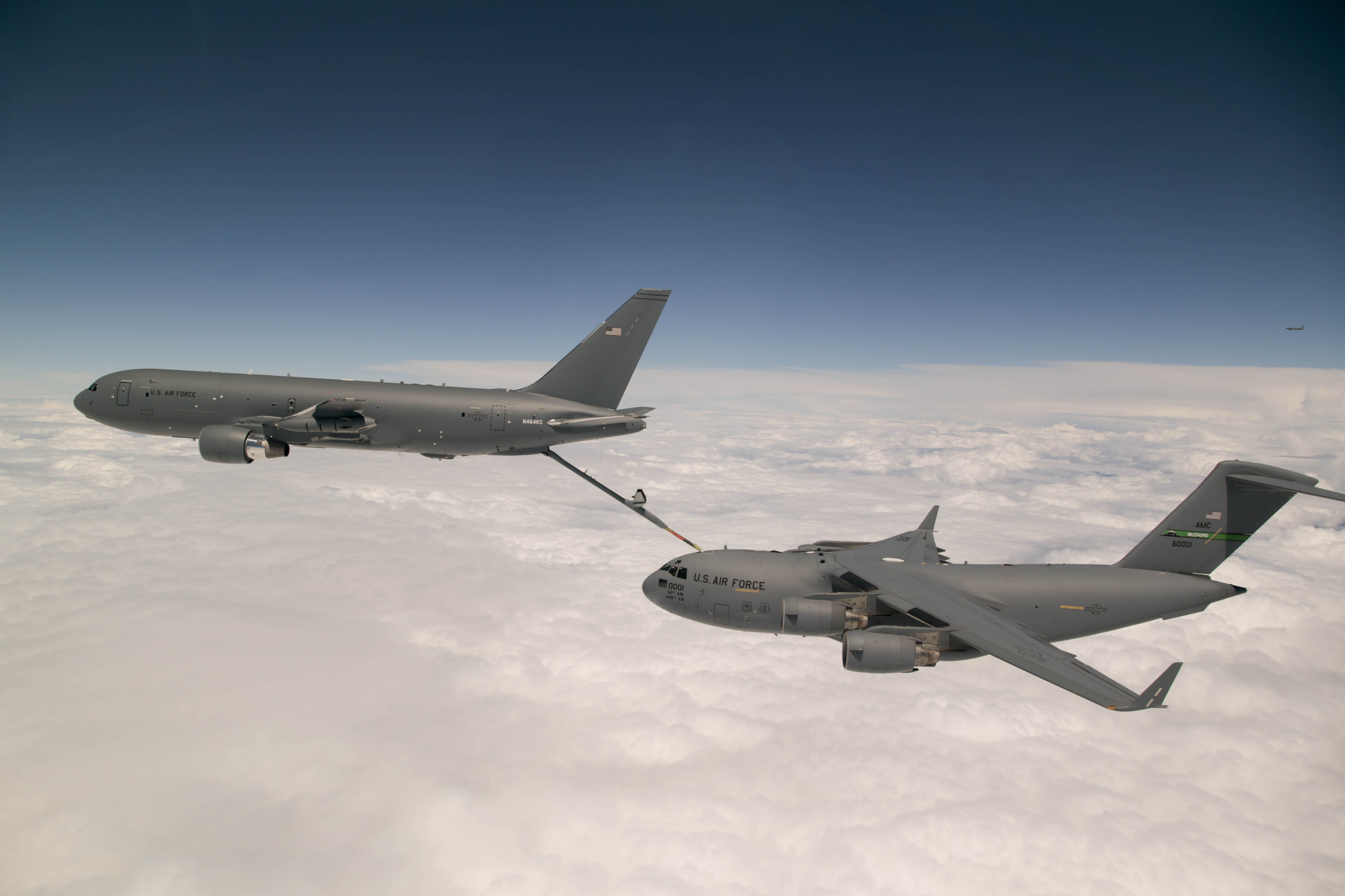
The KC-46 and C-17 are comtemporary key assets of the AMC.

AMC accepted its first C-17 Globemaster III at Charleston AFB, South Carolina, on 14 June 1993, and declared initial operational capability on 17 January 1995. AMC's second C-17 wing was established at McChord AFB, Washington, in July 1999. The versatile C-17, America's core military airlift platform, is a key player in the Air Force's post-Cold War strategy of "global reach, global power."

The C-17 replaced the C-141 Starlifter fleet inherited from Military Airlift Command (MAC). C-141s were retired as C-17s were accepted into the inventory. First seeing operational service in 1965 under the Military Air Transport Service (MATS), the last Starlifters were retired in the early 2000s. By 2004, the C-141 left AMC service with active duty USAF units, being confined to Air Force Reserve and Air National Guard units for the remainder of its operational service life. In 2004, 2005, and 2006, the C-141s assigned to the 445 AW participated in missions to Iraq and Afghanistan, mostly for the medical evacuation of wounded service members. The last eight C-141s were officially retired in 2006.

The C-5 Galaxy airlifter, also inherited from MAC, is being modernized and upgraded into the C-5M Super Galaxy model. It is planned to modernize all C-5Bs and C-5Cs and many of the C-5As to the C-5M standard. The first C-5M conversion was completed on 16 May 2006 and performed its first flight on 19 June 2006. AMC received its final C-5M conversation on 1 August 2018. It is estimated that the modifications will extend the service life of the C-5 to about 2040.

AMC fields the C-130J Super Hercules as its tactical airlift platform. Most legacy models of the C-130 Hercules (e.g., C-130E, C-130H, C-130H2) in AFRC and ANG units have been or will eventually be replaced by the C-130J Super Hercules. The C-130 family has the longest continuous production run of any military aircraft in history and has served in every branch of the U.S. armed forces except the U.S. Army and U.S. Space Force. During more than 50 years of service, the C-130 has participated in military, civilian, and humanitarian aid operations. It is likely that future improvements to the C-130 will mean the design will be in service into the foreseeable future.

The upgrades of the inherited Strategic Air Command KC-135 Stratotanker to E, R, RT, and T models have extended their airframe and powerplant lifetimes to 36,000 (E) and 39,000 flying hours (R, RT and T), respectively. The last KC-135E was retired in 2009 and all remaining operational USAF KC-135 aircraft are of the KC-135R, KC-135RT, or KC-135T series. Acquired by SAC in the late 1950s, according to the Air Force, only a few KC-135s would reach these lifetime limits before 2040; but at that time, some of the aircraft would be about 80 years old. The Air Force estimates that their current fleet of KC-135s have between 12,000 and 14,000 flying hours on them, only 33 percent of the lifetime flying hour limit and none will meet the limit until 2040. Therefore, the USAF has decided to replace the KC-135 fleet. However, since there were originally over 500 KC-135s with the since-retired KC-135E included, these aircraft will be replaced gradually, with the first batch of about 100 aircraft to be replaced in the current buy. The effort to replace the KC-135 has been marked by intense controversy. Beginning in 2021, AMC began accepting the new KC-46A Pegasus tanker into its inventory.

The 59 KC-10 Extender tankers, originally acquired in the 1980s by SAC, operated largely in the refueling of large numbers of fighter aircraft on ferry flights, the refueling of heavy bomber or other transport aircraft, or as supplemental airlift aircraft for palletized cargo, augmenting the C-5 and C-17 fleet. AMC retired the KC-10 fleet in 2024. Conversely, the KC-135 fleet has operated largely in the in-theater role. In an attempt to modernize the platform, the USAF has awarded Boeing a US$216 million contract to upgrade its fleet of 59 aircraft with new communication, navigation, and surveillance and air traffic management system to operate into the 2020s.

== History ==
The direct successor to the USAF Military Airlift Command, the emblem of Air Mobility Command retained the historic emblem of not only the Military Airlift Command, but also the Military Air Transport Service (MATS), established in 1948 as the first Department of Defense Unified Command. The heritage of Air Mobility Command also includes the air refueling heritage inherited from the historic Strategic Air Command.

=== Lineage ===
Air Transport Command

- Constituted as the Air Corps Ferrying Command on 29 May 1941
- Redesignated: Army Air Forces Ferry Command on 9 March 1942
- Redesignated: Army Air Forces Ferrying Command on 31 March 1942
- Redesignated: Air Transport Command on 1 July 1942

Inactivated, on 1 June 1948

Military Airlift Command

- Established as Military Air Transport Service on 1 June 1948 and activated
- Redesignated Military Airlift Command on 1 January 1966

Designated a specified command on 1 February 1977

- Consolidated with Military Air Transport Service on 13 May 1982

Lost specified command status on 1 October 1988
Inactivated on 1 June 1992

Air Mobility Command

- Established as Air Mobility Command and activated on 1 June 1992

Consolidated with Military Airlift Command on 1 October 2016

=== Assignments ===
- General Headquarters, Air Force (later, Air Force Combat Command; Army Air Forces; United States Air Force), 29 Mar 1941 – present

=== Stations ===
- Washington D.C., 29 May 1941 - 1 Jun 1948
- Gravelly Point, Virginia, 1 June 1948 - 1 December 1948
- Andrews AFB, Maryland, 1 December 1948 - 15 January 1958
- Scott Air Force Base, Illinois, 15 January 1958 – present

=== Major components ===
Air Forces

- Fifteenth Air Force (15 AF), 1 June 1992 – present
- Eighteenth Air Force (18 AF), 1 October 2003 – present
- Twenty-First Air Force (21 AF) (previously 23 Army Air Forces Ferrying Wing; North Atlantic Wing; North Atlantic Division; Atlantic Division; Eastern Transport Air Force), 18 June 1942 – 1 October 2003; 5 September 2025 - present
- Twenty-Second Air Force (22 AF), (previously Domestic Wing (later, Ferrying Division; Continental Division; Western Transport Air Force) 18 February 1942 - 31 October 1946; 1 July 1948 – present
- Twenty-Third Air Force, 1 Mar 1983 – 22 May 1990

Wings and Divisions

- Foreign Wing: 21 Feb 1942 – 25 Jun 1942
- Air Transportation Division, 1 Jun 1942 - 15 Mar 1943
- Domestic Transportation Division, 15 Mar 1943 - 27 Nov 1944
- Alaskan Wing (later, Alaskan Division), 1 Oct 1942 - 1 Apr 1946
- Caribbean Wing (later, Caribbean Division), 19 Jun 1942 - 20 Sep 1945
- Central African Wing (later, Central African Division), 15 Dec 1943 - 18 Jul 1945
- European Wing (later, European Division), c. 14 Jan 1943 - 30 Jun 1947
- India-China Division, 1 Dec 1942 – 15 Feb 1946
- North African Wing (later, North African; Atlantic) Division, 15 Dec 1943 – 1 Jun 1948
- Pacific Wing, Air Transport Command (later Pacific Division, Air Transport Command), 5 Jan 1943 - 1 Jun 1948
- Pacific Division, Military Air Transport Service, 1 Jun 1948 - 1 Jul 1958
- South Atlantic Wing (later, South Atlantic Division), 26 Jun 1942 - 20 Sep 1945

Direct Reporting Units

- 618th Air Operations Center (Tanker Airlift Control Center) (Previously Air Mobility Command Tanker Airlift Control Center; 618th Tanker Airlift Control Center; 618th Air and Space Operations Center (Tanker Airlift Control Center), 1 June 1992 – 1 October 2003, 6 January 2019 – Present
- Military Airlift Command Airlift Operations School (later, USAF Air Mobility School; Air Mobility Warfare Center; USAF Air Mobility School (later, Air Mobility Warfare Center, USAF Expeditionary Center)), 15 Jul 1978 – present
- Air Transport Command Replacement Center, 14 Nov 1942-31 Mar 1944
- Military Airlift Command Airlift Operations School (later, USAF Air Mobility School; Air Mobility Warfare Center; USAF Expeditionary Center), 15 Jul 1978-.
- USAF Aeronautical Chart and Information Service (later, USAF Aeronautical Chart and Information Center), 11 May 1952-1 Jul 1960
- United States Air Force Airlift (later, USAF Mobility Center), 1 Dec 1975-1 Jan 1995

Services

- Aeronautical Chart, 13 Mar 1946-21 May 1947
- Aerospace Cartographic and Geodetic, 8 Oct 1968-30 Jun 1972
- Air Communications (later, Airways and Air Communications), 13 Mar 1946-1 Jul 1961
- Air Photographic and Charting (later, Aerospace Audio-Visual; Aerospace Audiovisual; Air Combat Camera), 16 Apr 1952-1 Oct 1994
- Air Rescue (later, Aerospace Rescue and Recovery; Air Rescue), 13 Mar 1946-1 Mar 1983; 1 Aug 1989-1 Feb 1993
- Air Resupply and Communications, 23 Feb 1951-1 Jan 1954
- Air Transport, 8 Oct 1947-1 Jun 1948
- Air Weather, 13 Mar 1946-1 Apr 1991
- Armed Forces Courier (later, Defense Courier), 1 Oct 1987-1 Jan 1995; 1 Oct 1998-1 Oct 2004
- Flight, 13 Mar 1946-1 Oct 1956
- Flying Safety, 13 Mar-15 Nov 1946

== List of Commanders, Air Mobility Command ==
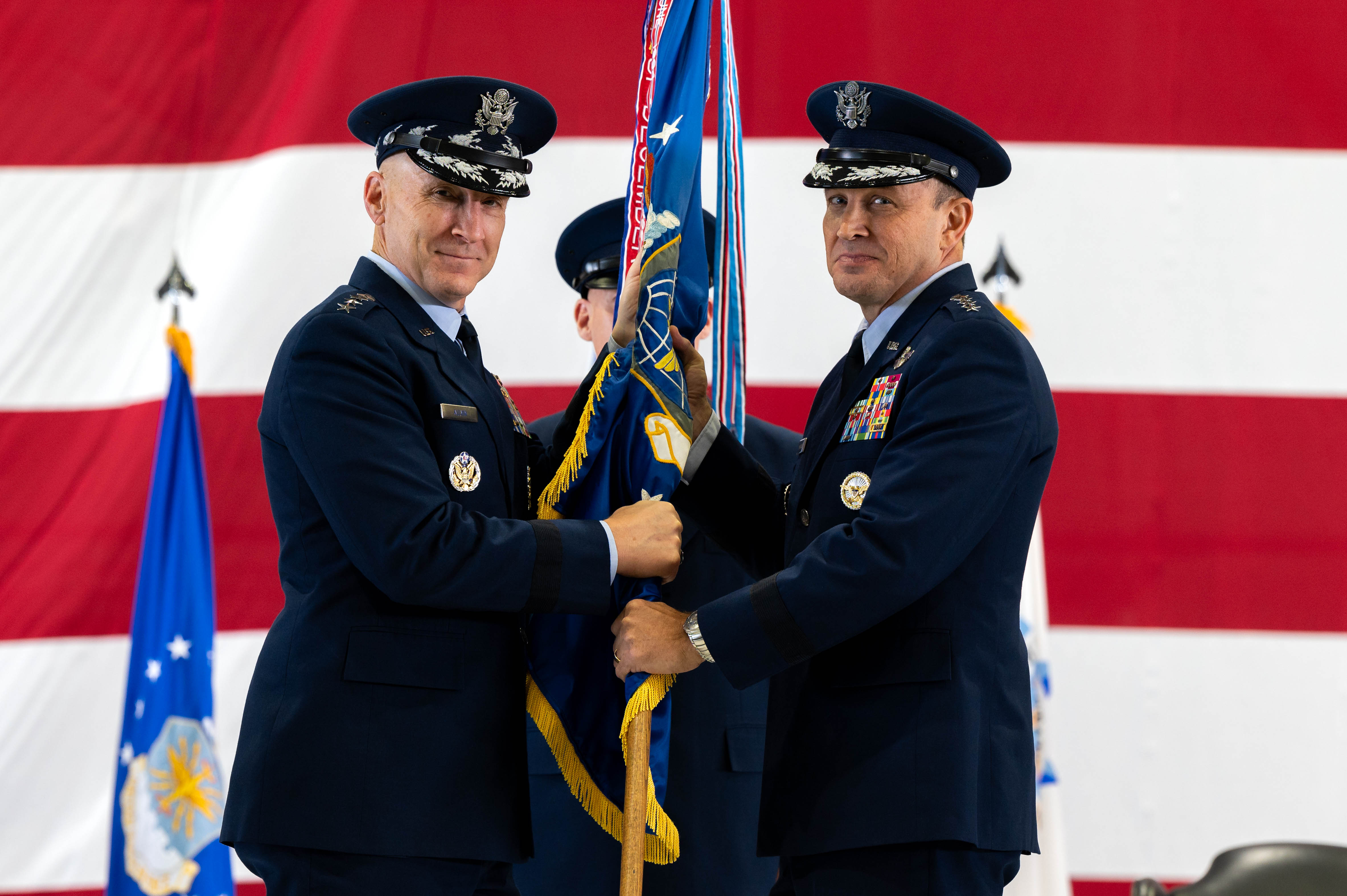
General John Lamontagne, incoming AMC commander, accepts the command guidon from General David W. Allvin, chief of staff of the Air Force, during a change of command ceremony on September 9, 2024.

No.	Commander		Term		
No.	Portrait	Name	Took office	Left office	Term length
1	Hansford T. Johnson	General; Hansford T. Johnson (born 1936)	1 June 1992	25 August 1992	85 days
2	Ronald R. Fogleman	General; Ronald R. Fogleman (born 1942)	25 August 1992	18 October 1994	2 years, 54 days
3	Robert L. Rutherford	General; Robert L. Rutherford (born 1938)	18 October 1994	15 July 1996	1 year, 271 days
4	Walter Kross	General; Walter Kross (born 1942)	15 July 1996	3 August 1998	2 years, 19 days
5	Charles T. Robertson Jr.	General; Charles T. Robertson Jr. (born 1946)	3 August 1998	5 November 2001	3 years, 94 days
6	John W. Handy	General; John W. Handy (born 1944)	5 November 2001	7 September 2005	3 years, 306 days
-	Christopher A. Kelly	Lieutenant General; Christopher A. Kelly; Acting	7 September 2005	14 October 2005	37 days
7	Duncan McNabb	General; Duncan McNabb (born 1952)	14 October 2005	7 September 2007	1 year, 328 days
8	Arthur Lichte	General; Arthur Lichte (born 1949)	7 September 2007	20 November 2009	2 years, 74 days
9	Raymond E. Johns Jr.	General; Raymond E. Johns Jr. (born 1954)	20 November 2009	30 November 2012	3 years, 10 days
10	Paul J. Selva	General; Paul J. Selva (born 1958)	30 November 2012	5 May 2014	1 year, 156 days
11	Darren W. McDew	General; Darren W. McDew (born 1960)	5 May 2014	11 August 2015	1 year, 98 days
12	Carlton D. Everhart II	General; Carlton D. Everhart II (born 1961)	11 August 2015	7 September 2018	3 years, 27 days
13	Maryanne Miller	General; Maryanne Miller	7 September 2018	20 August 2020	1 year, 348 days
14	Jacqueline Van Ovost	General; Jacqueline Van Ovost (born 1965)	20 August 2020	5 October 2021	1 year, 46 days
15	Mike Minihan	General; Mike Minihan (born 1967)	5 October 2021	9 September 2024	2 years, 340 days
16	John Lamontagne	General; John Lamontagne (born c. 1970)	9 September 2024	6 February 2026	1 year, 150 days
-	Rebecca Sonkiss	Lieutenant General; Rebecca Sonkiss (born c. 1972); Acting	6 February 2026	3 August 2026	178 days
17	Daniel Tulley	Lieutenant General; Daniel Tulley (born c. 1970)	3 August 2026	Incumbent	39 days

== See also ==
- United States Transportation Command
- U.S. Army Transportation Command
- Military Sealift Command (U.S. Navy)
- Phoenix Mobility Program
