= Rebecca Sonkiss =

U.S. Air Force general officer

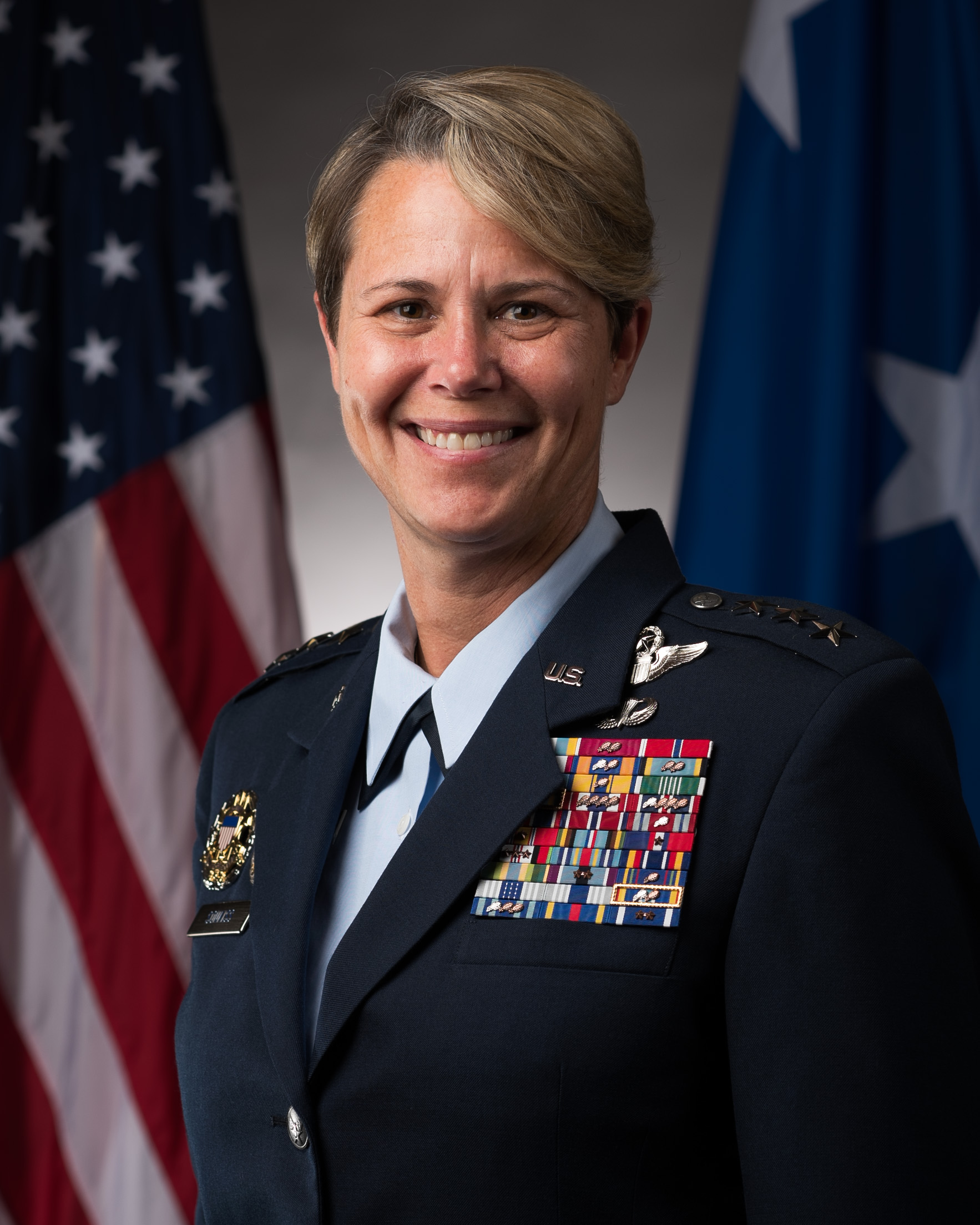
- Official portrait, 2024
- Born: c. 1972 (age 53–54)
- Military career
- Allegiance: United States
- Branch: United States Air Force
- Service years: 1994–2026
- Rank: Lieutenant General
- Commands: Air Mobility Command (Acting); 618th Air Operations Center; 89th Airlift Wing; 62nd Airlift Wing; 15th Airlift Squadron
- Awards: Defense Superior Service Medal (2); Legion of Merit (3); Bronze Star Medal

Rebecca J. Sonkiss (born c. 1972) is a retired United States Air Force lieutenant general who served as the deputy commander of Air Mobility Command. She served as the deputy commander of Air Force Special Operations Command and commander of the 618th Air Operations Center.

In April 2024, Sonkiss was nominated for promotion to lieutenant general and assignment as deputy commander of Air Mobility Command. On 24 July 2024, defense secretary Lloyd Austin announced that then-president Joe Biden had nominated to the grade of lieutenant general: "Air Force Maj. Gen. Rebecca J. Sonkiss for appointment to the grade of lieutenant general with assignment as deputy commander, Air Mobility Command, Scott Air Force Base, Illinois. Sonkiss is currently serving as deputy commander, Air Force Special Operations Command, Hurlburt Field, Florida". In October 2024, Sonkiss was appointed deputy commander of Air Mobility Command and served as interim AMC commander between February and August 2026.

In September 2026, Sonkiss retired from the Air Force after thirty-two years of service.

== Aircraft Flown ==
T-37B, T-44, C-130E, EC-130E/H, RQ-1A/B, C-130J, C-17A, C-37A/B and C-32A

== Hours Flown ==
4,598 flight hours
1,377 combat hours

Military offices
Preceded by Leonard Kosinski	Commander of the 62nd Airlift Wing; 2017–2018	Succeeded by Scovill W. Currin Jr.
Preceded by Casey D. Eaton	Commander of the 89th Airlift Wing; 2018–2020	Succeeded by Matthew E. Jones
Preceded by Lance R. Bunch	Deputy Director of Counter Threats and International Cooperation of the Joint Staff; 2020–2022	Succeeded by ???
Preceded by Daniel A. DeVoe	Commander of the 618th Air Operations Center (Tanker Airlift Control Center); 2022–2023	Succeeded by Corey A. Simmons
Preceded by Matthew Wolfe Davidson	Deputy Commander of Air Force Special Operations Command; 2023–2024	Succeeded by Justin R. Hoffman
Preceded by Randall Reed	Deputy Commander of Air Mobility Command; 2024–2026	Succeeded by Gerald A. Donohue
