= Phoenix Mobility Program =

- Active: 2005 -
- Country: United States
- Branch: Air Force
- Size: 36 active personnel
- Part of: Air Mobility Command
- Locations: McGuire Air Force Base; Travis Air Force Base

The PHOENIX MOBILITY (PM) PROGRAM is an Air Mobility Command (AMC)-sponsored professional development program for board selected Air Force officers with 4–8 years commissioned service. The purpose of the program is to develop officers with a strong foundation in expeditionary mobility operations while developing an understanding of senior leadership responsibilities. The PHOENIX MOBILITY program is open to rated and nonrated line officers. Selected officers will become fluent in Air and Space Operations Center (AOC) operations, Contingency Response Wing (CRW) operations, and En Route Mobility Operations (EMO). This 36-month assignment builds mobility leaders by immersing the officers into the heart of the AMC mission. Rated PHOENIX MOBILITY officers who are current and qualified in a MWS will be authorized to fly in attached status.

== Competencies ==
The program focuses on establishing a foundation of competencies associated with expeditionary mobility operations. These competencies can be divided into four distinct areas: AOC operations, CRW operations, EMO and Officer Professional Development (OPD). Each PHOENIX MOBILITY officer will gain an in-depth knowledge of each area to meet the overall goal of developing future senior leaders with a sound understanding of all aspects of air mobility operations. PHOENIX MOBILITY officers can expect to be transitioned throughout the CRW/Expeditionary Mobility Task Force (EMTF) in order to gain exposure to the full spectrum of mobility operations.

== Locations ==
The PHOENIX MOBILITY PROGRAM is a bicoastal organization. The east coast part of the program is in the Twenty-First Expeditionary Task Force at McGuire Air Force Base, New Jersey. The west coast part of the program is in the Fifteenth Expeditionary Task Force at Travis Air Force Base, California.

== Air and Space Operations Center (AOC) Operations ==
Members will focus on the operational level of warfare with particular respect to planning, execution, and command and control of theater airlift/tanker assets from the perspective of the Air Mobility Division through serving in a deployed or exercise AOC.

== Contingency Response Wing (CRW) Operations ==
Members will focus on Contingency Response Group (CRG) and Contingency Response Element (CRE) operations in support of an airbase opening during contingencies, humanitarian relief operations, or exercises.

== En Route Mobility Operations (EMO) ==
Members will gain exposure and firsthand familiarity with the AMC fixed en route structure and its ability to support the AMC mission.

== See also ==
- 615th Contingency Response Wing
- 621st Contingency Response Wing
