= Lionair (Philippines) =

Airline of the Philippines

Lionair, Inc.
- Founded: 2011
- Ceased operations: 2020
- Operating bases: Ninoy Aquino International Airport
- Website: Official website, archived from the original on March 30, 2020

Lionair, Inc., operated as Lionair, was a charter airline and a general aviation company that operated in the Philippines with base operation in Pasay. It operated charter passenger using fixed-wing and rotary-winged aircraft.

== History ==
On August 2, 2011, the Philippine Senate conducted a hearing on the alleged involvement of the company in the sale to the Philippine National Police of used helicopters that were described as brand new.

The Civil Aviation Authority of the Philippines (CAAP) had grounded Lionair in late March 2020, after a second fatal crash in just over six months.

== Fleet ==
- Cessna Citation 500
- IAI Westwind I
- IAI Westwind II
- Beechcraft B200 King Air
- Let L-410 UPV
- Robinson R44

== Accidents and incidents ==
- On September 1, 2019, a Beechcraft Super King Air 350 on a medevac mission from Dipolog crashed into a resort in Calamba, Laguna, due to engine failure. The aircraft, registered as RP-C2296, was written off. All nine passengers on board died.
- On March 29, 2020, a Lionair IAI Westwind plane registered as RP-C5880 caught fire and exploded, while taking off from Ninoy Aquino International Airport in Manila, killing all eight people on board. The aircraft was on a medevac mission to Tokyo, Japan.
