= 618th Air Operations Center (Tanker Airlift Control Center) =

Air Operations Center for the US Air Force

- Tanker Airlift Control Center
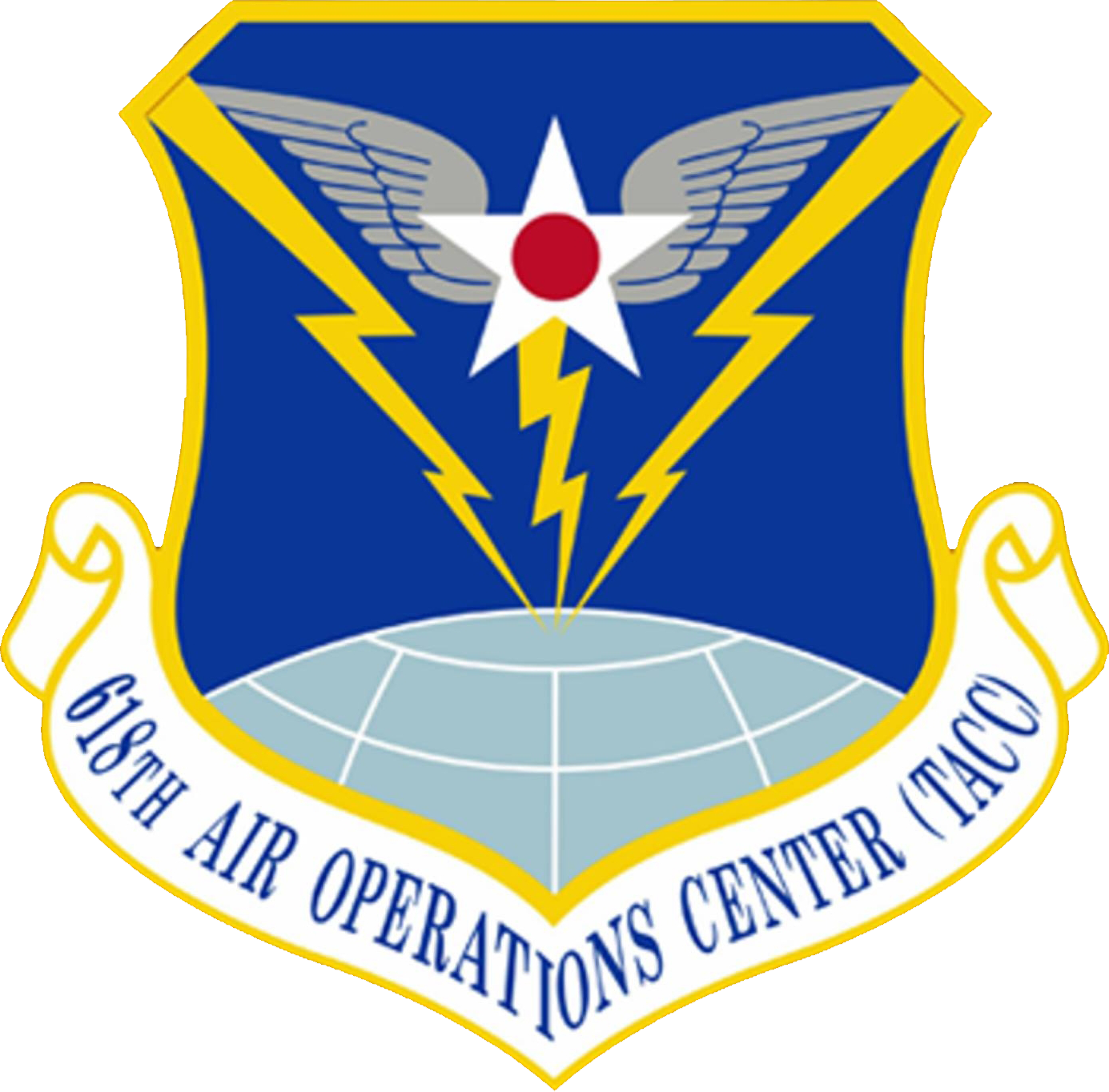
- Center emblem
- Active: 1992 – present
- Country: United States
- Branch: United States Air Force
- Type: Air operations center
- Role: Coordination and execution of air mobility operations
- Size: c. 800 personnel
- Part of: Air Mobility Command; US Transportation Command
- Base: Scott Air Force Base, Illinois

Commanders
- Current commander: Brigadier General Michele A. Lo Bianco

The 618th Air Operations Center (Tanker Airlift Control Center (618 AOC (TACC) or 618 AOC) is the only Air Operations Center (AOC) in Air Mobility Command (AMC) and the largest AOC in the US Air Force. The 618 AOC was activated on 1 April 1992 as the Air Mobility Tanker Airlift Control Center. It is headquartered at Scott Air Force Base, Illinois and assigned to the Air Mobility Command Directorate of Operations, Strategic Deterrence, and Nuclear Integration (AMC/A3).

== Overview ==
The 618th Air Operations Center, located at Scott Air Force Base, Illinois, is the Department of Defense's largest Air Operations Center, bringing together over 800 active duty, Reserve, National Guard, civilian and contractor personnel to support global mobility operations in all Combatant Commands. The 618 AOC serves as Air Mobility Command's expert when planning, tasking, executing, and assessing mobility missions; an invaluable resource when maintaining America's global reach.

Commanding a fleet of nearly 1,100 mobility aircraft, the 618 AOC provides our warfighters downrange with the mobility support they need to ensure mission success. The 618 AOC commands 100 to 150 missions a day on average, proudly providing unrivaled command and control across the full spectrum of mobility operations to include airlift, air refueling, aeromedical evacuation, and the global mobility support system.

The lights are always on in the AOC, maintaining 24/7 operations, 365 days a year to transform requirements into effective missions around the world. For over 30 years, the 618 AOC has been the focal point when providing command and control to mobility forces, ensuring global delivery whenever and wherever we're needed.

As an air operations center, commanding combat forces around the globe, the 618 AOC is a committed partner for today's and tomorrow’s expeditionary Air Force. The 618 AOC stands ready to support mobility operations in contested environments through world-class, multi-domain command and control.

== History ==
Formerly under 18 AF, now directly under AMC, the 618th Air Operations Center (Tanker Airlift Control Center), located at Scott AFB, serves as the organization's air operations center, planning and directing tanker and transport aircraft operations around the world. It is stationed at Scott Air Force Base, Illinois. The 618 AOC (TACC) is responsible for planning, scheduling, and tracking aircraft performing airlift, aerial refueling, and aeromedical evacuation operations around the world. It serves as an Air Operations Center (AOC) for AMC, executing missions assigned by the United States Transportation Command (USTRANSCOM).

The 618 AOC (TACC), initially known as TACC, became operational on 1 April 1992. Air mobility leadership sought to simplify the execution of the worldwide mobility mission. They created a highly efficient organization to centralize command and control operations that previously resided within numbered air forces and airlift divisions. TACC was redesignated as the 618 TACC on 1 April 2007, and remained under that designation until being renamed the 618 AOC (TACC) on 30 August 2010. AMC extensively reorganized the 618 AOC in 2020 and reassigned it from 18 AF to the AMC Directorate of Operations, Strategic Deterrence, and Nuclear Integration (AMC/A3).

=== Lineage ===
- Established as Air Mobility Command Tanker Airlift Control Center on 25 February 1992

Activated on 1 April 1992

- Redesignated 618th Tanker Airlift Control Center on 1 April 2007
- Redesignated 618th Air and Space Operations Center (Tanker Airlift Control Center) on 30 August 2010
- Redesignated 618th Air Operations Center (Tanker Airlift Control Center) on 1 November 2014

==== Assignments ====
- Air Mobility Command, 1 April 1992 – 1 April 2007
- Eighteenth Air Force (Air Forces Transportation), 1 April 2007 - 6 January 2019
- Air Mobility Command, 6 January 2019 – Present

==== Stations ====
- Scott AFB, Illinois, 1 April 1992 – present.
