= Pansol =

- Barangay
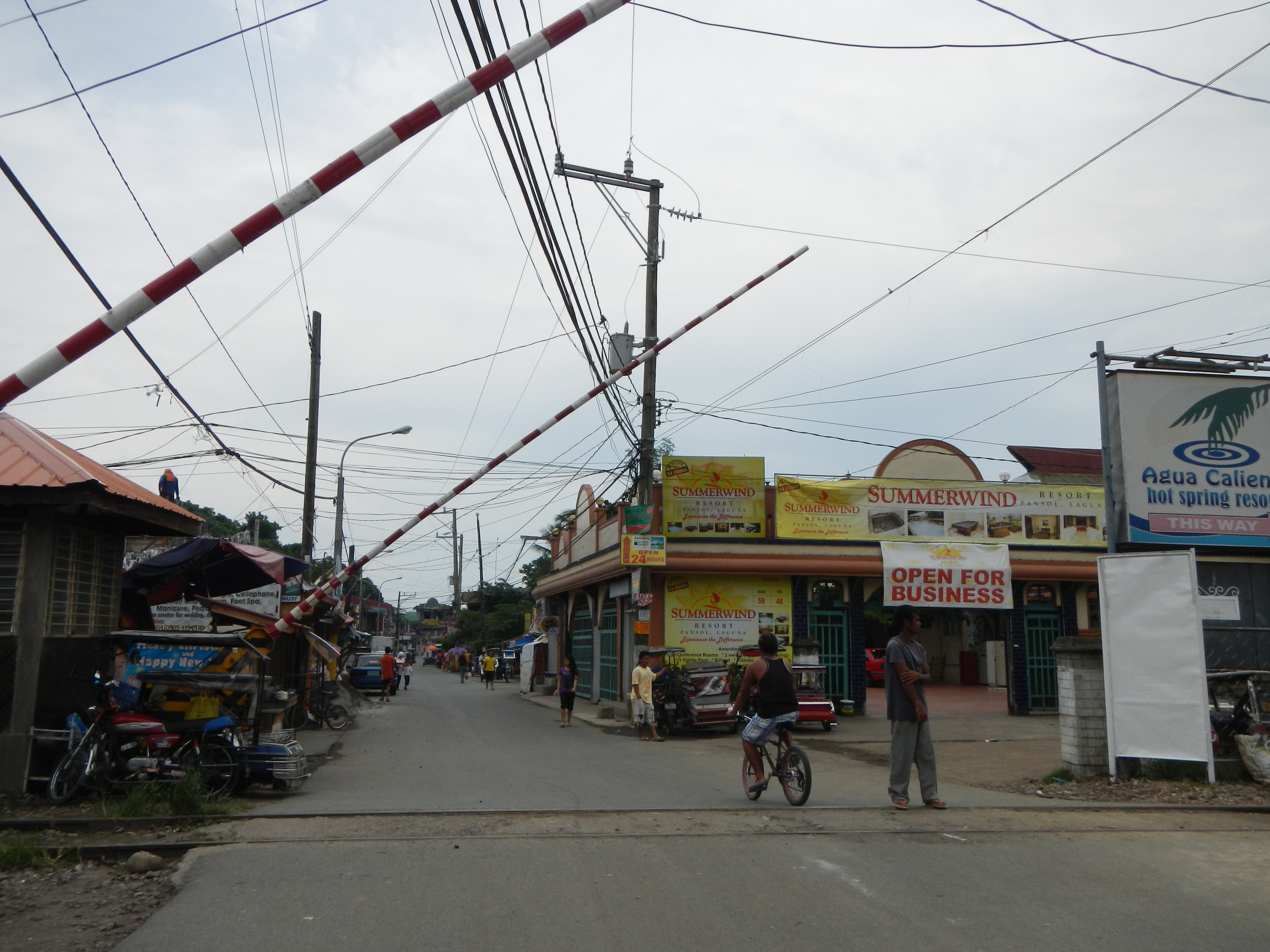
- Pansol (2013)

- Seal
- Coordinates: 14°11′43″N 121°10′19″E
- Country: Philippines
- City: Calamba
- Province: Laguna
- Region: Calabarzon (Region IV-A)

Government
  - Chairman: Joel D. Martinez
  - Councilors: Simonne T. Canlas; Jane B. Varona; Danilo P. Cuevas Jr.; Marcelino P. Ameglio; Magdalena M. Fabroquez; Rebecca G. Fontanilla; Alberto F. Luar

Area
  - Land: 5.282 km^{2} (2.039 sq mi)

Population (2024)
  - Total: 12,099
  - Density: 2,291/km^{2} (5,933/sq mi)

Pansol is an urban barangay in Calamba, Laguna, Philippines. It is located at the southeast edge of the city. The barangay is situated at the foot of Mount Makiling near the city's border with Los Baños and is known for its hot springs.

== Etymology ==
The name "Pansol" is derived from the Tagalog word pansol, meaning "spring".

== Economy ==
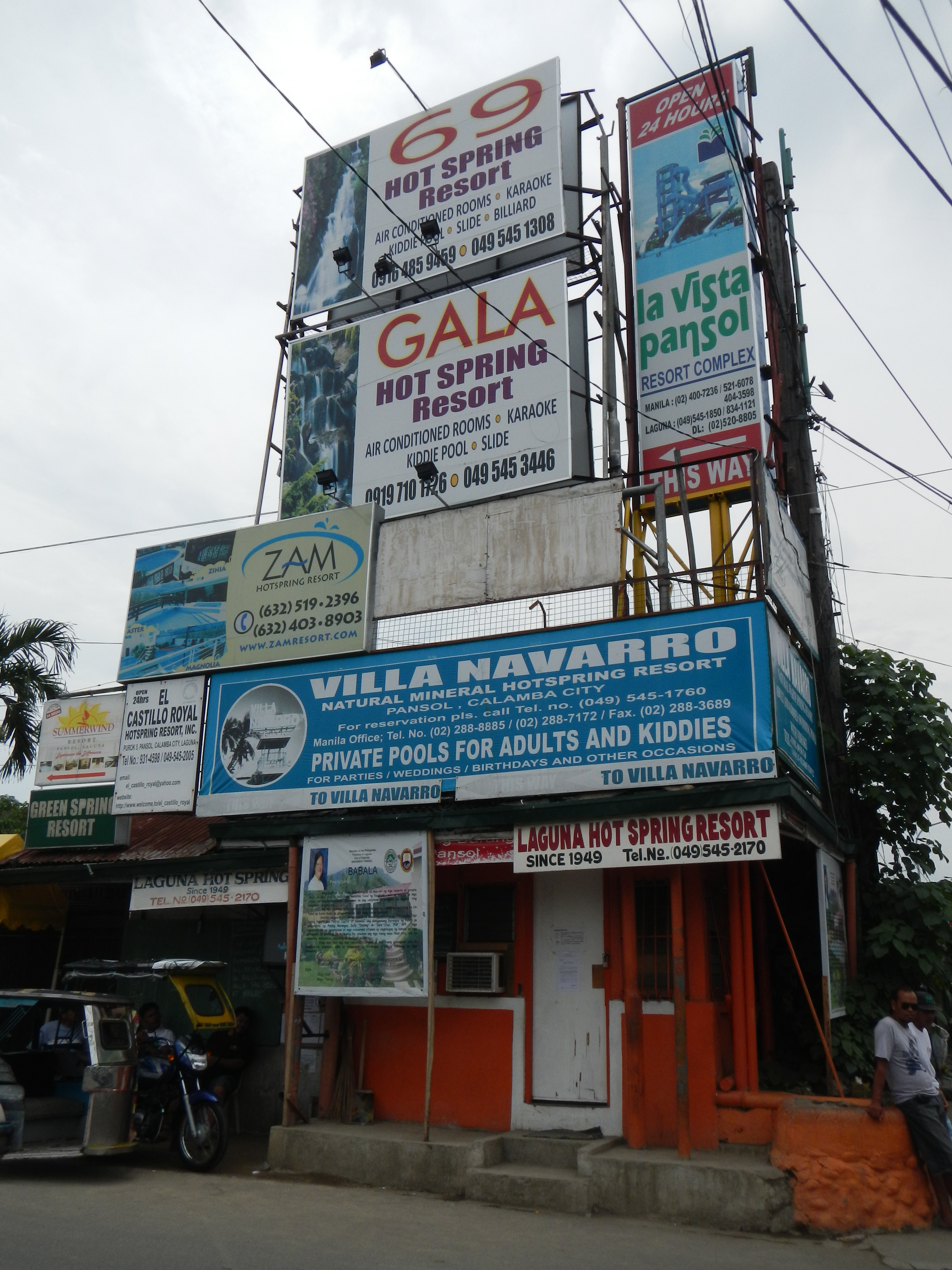
Billboards at the National Highway advertising several resorts in Pansol

The resorts industry of Pansol contributes significantly to the barangay's economy and has been known as a tourist destination for its resorts since the 1970s. As of October 2009, there are about 700 resorts in Pansol.

== Geography ==
Pansol is subdivided into seven puroks numbered I to VII. The barangay covers a total area of 5.28 km^{2} (2.04 sq mi). It is surrounded by five other barangays.

Directions	Barangay
West	Maunong
East	Sucol; Bagong Kalsada
South	Puting Lupa
North	Bucal

== Population ==
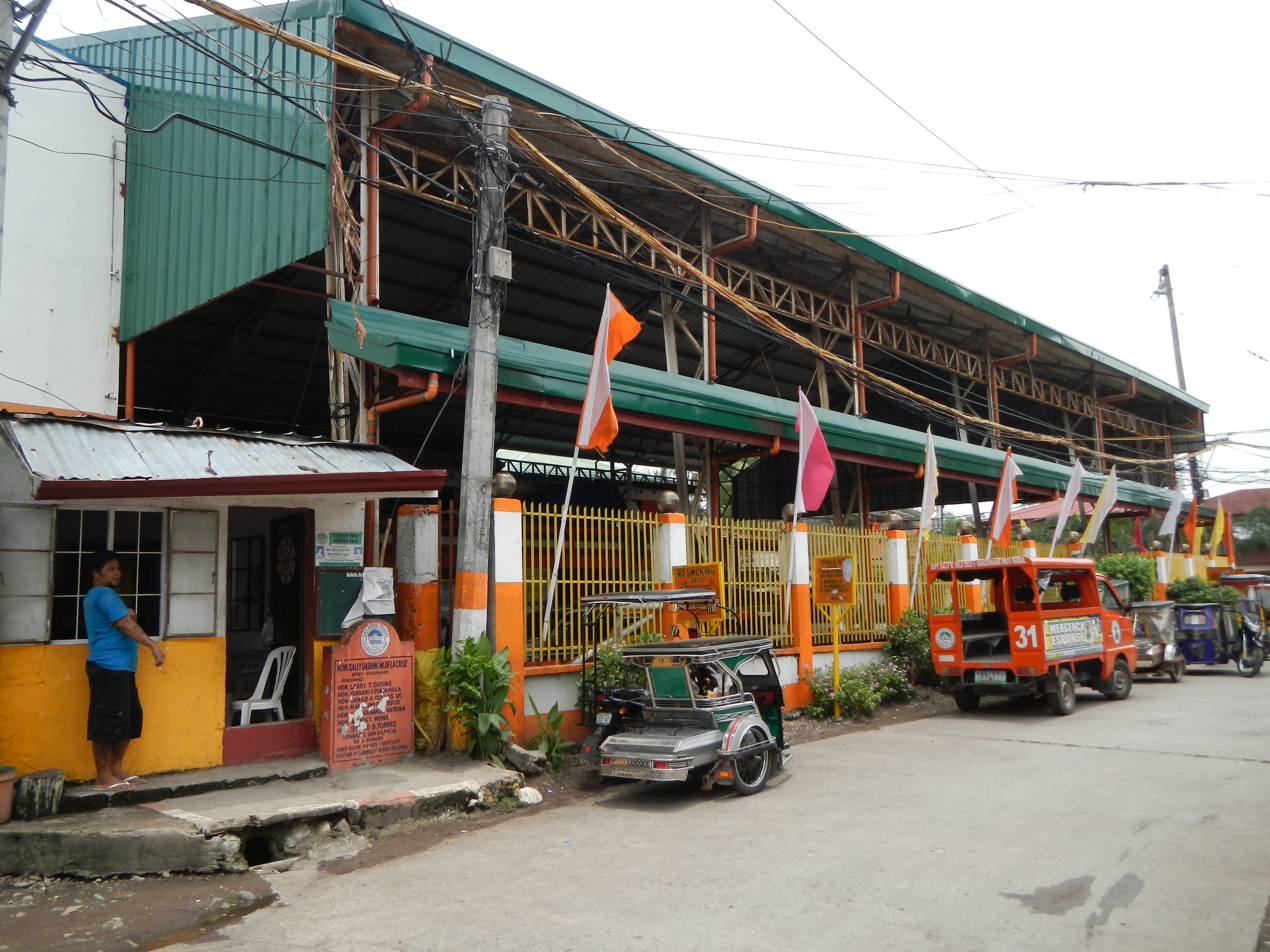
Barangay Hall of Pansol

Population census of Brgy. Pansol
Year	Pop.	±% p.a.
1980	3,192	—
1990	4,941	+4.47%
1995	6,517	+5.32%
2000	8,378	+5.53%
2007	9,980	+2.44%
2010	10,868	+3.15%
2015	10,156	−1.28%
2020	11,623	+2.88%
2024	12,099	+0.97%

== Education ==
Pansol is the site of at least two elementary schools namely E. Baretto Sr. Elementary School and Perpetual Help Elementary School as well as a senior high school, the E. Baretto National High School.
