= Gulfstream G100 =

Business jet

G100
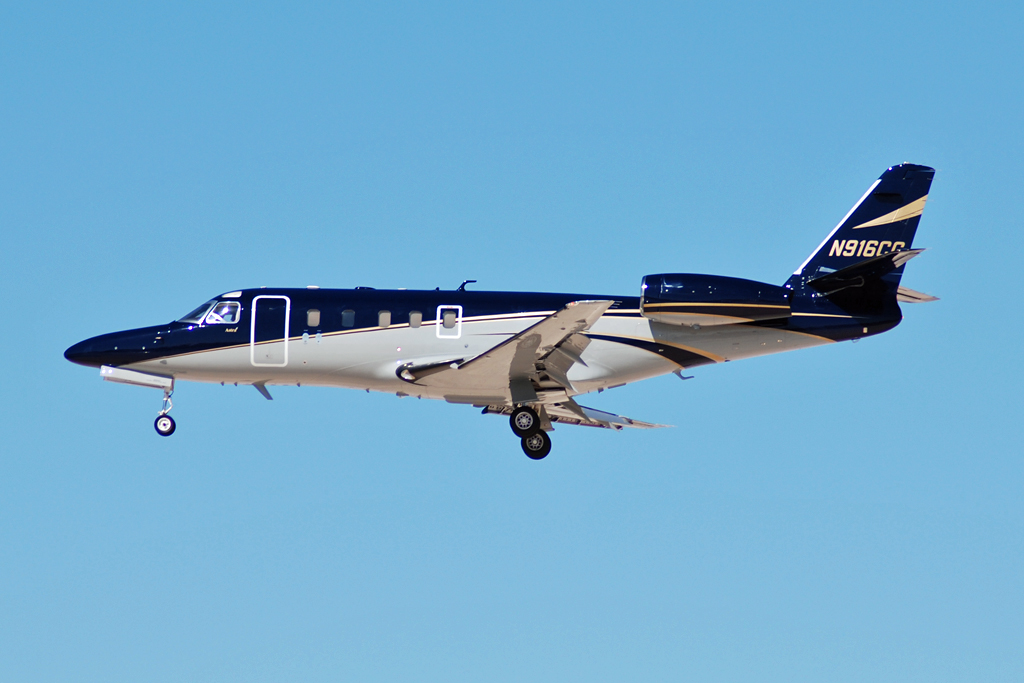

General information
- Type: Business jet
- Manufacturer: Gulfstream Aerospace
- Status: In service
- Primary user: United States Navy
- Number built: 265: 145 Astra/G100 + 120 G150

History
- Manufactured: 1985–2017
- First flight: 1984
- Developed from: IAI Westwind
- Developed into: Gulfstream G200

The Gulfstream G100 (formerly known as the IAI Astra) is a twin-engine business jet designed and initially produced by Israel Aerospace Industries (IAI) and subsequently by Gulfstream Aerospace.

Development of the Astra, which was derived from the preceding Model 1124 Westwind stated by IAI in the 1970s. The prototype made its maiden flight on 19 March 1984, certification was issued in 1985 and deliveries of the initial model started in 1986. Continued development led to several improved models, including the Astra SP, Astra SPX, and the IAI Galaxy. After Gulfstream acquired Galaxy Aerospace in May 2001, development and production of the aircraft was initially shared between IAI and Gulfstream. In September 2002, Gulfstream announced the development of the G150, a derivative of the G100 that had an enlarged fuselage, newer avionics, and increased maximum takeoff weight (MTOW); it was certified in 2005. Due to declining sales, Gulfstream opted to cease production of the G150 in 2017.

Customers of the type included both civil and military operators. Both the United States Air Force and the United States Navy have made use of modified G100s, designated C-38A Courier, as transports and chase planes. In one high-profile incident in October 2012, an Eritrean Air Force Astra was stolen by two Eritrean Air Force officers and flown to Saudi Arabia.

== Development ==
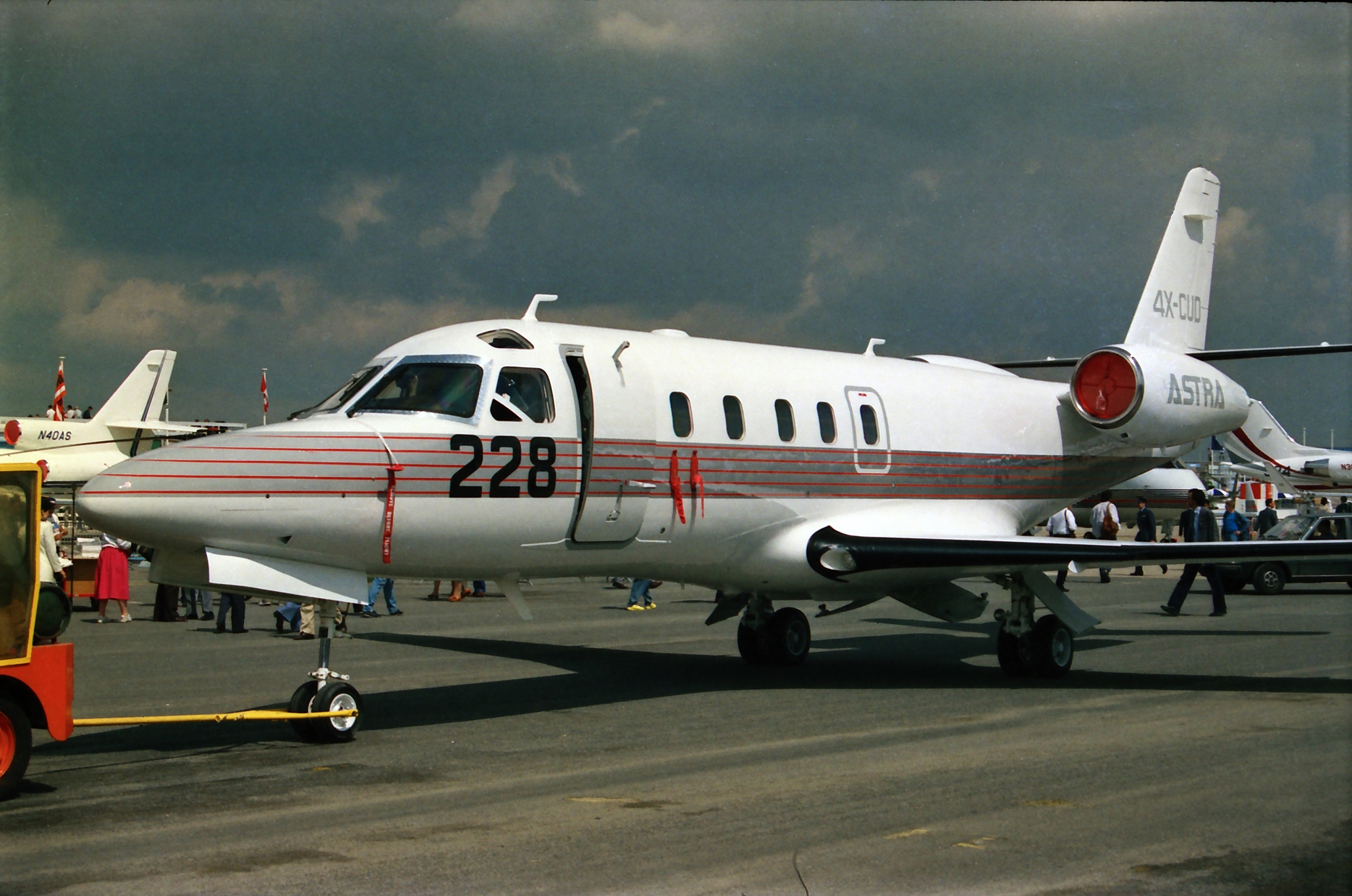
IAI Astra at the 1988 Paris Air Show

Israel Aerospace Industries (IAI) developed the Astra from its Model 1124 Westwind business jet. Work on an improved Westwind began in the late 1970s. On 19 March 1984, the first prototype performed its maiden flight. On 20 March 1985, the first production Astra made its first flight. Type certification for the aircraft was received from the Federal Aviation Administration (FAA) on 29 August 1985, which permitted customer deliveries to commence in 1986.

The original 1125 Astra was replaced by the Astra SP, announced in 1989, of which 37 aircraft were produced. The third variant, the winglet-equipped Astra SPX, flew for the first time in August 1994. In May 2001, the American company Gulfstream acquired Galaxy Aerospace, which held the Astra's type certificate; thereafter, this variant was rebranded as the G100. Production of the G100 was terminated in early 2006.

During the 1990s, work begun on a further development of the Astra; this involved modifications to the wing and its mating to a completely new fuselage. This project resulted in the IAI Galaxy, which was later rebranded as the Gulfstream G200.

In September 2002, Gulfstream announced that it was developing the G150, a derivative of the G100, in collaboration with IAI. This aircraft, which would become Gulfstream's first true mid-size business jet, features a wider (12 in) and longer fuselage (16 in aft of rear pressure bulkhead) that provides 25 percent more internal volume, along with updated avionics, and an increase in maximum takeoff weight (MTOW) to 26,100 pounds (11,839 kg) compared to the G100's MTOW of 24,650 pounds (11,181 kg). These changes accommodated a larger cabin that could fit up to eight passengers; various different cabin configurations were designed for the type. The G150's production arrangements took place in both Israel and the US; airframe assembly was performed at IAI's Tel Aviv plant and semi-completed aircraft were transferred to Gulfstream’s Dallas factory for completion.

In January 2005, the first G150 was rolled out in Tel Aviv. On 3 May 2005, the G150 performed its maiden flight from Ben Gurion International Airport, piloted by IAI chief test pilot Ronen Shapira and test pilot Yoram Geva. During this first flight, the aircraft's handling characteristics were explored while initial checks of all aircraft systems were performed, including the cycling of the landing gear, flaps, and slats. Both IAI and Gulfstream personnel participated in the flight test programme. In late 2005, the G150 was certified by the FAA. It has been certified for the steeper-than-normal approach path required to land at London City Airport.

In September 2016, Gulfstream announced that, owing to slowing sales of the type, production of the G150 would be terminated; delivery of the final aircraft took place in mid-2017. By 2018, second-hand G150s held a typical market value in the range of $3.8 to $4.8 million.

== Design ==
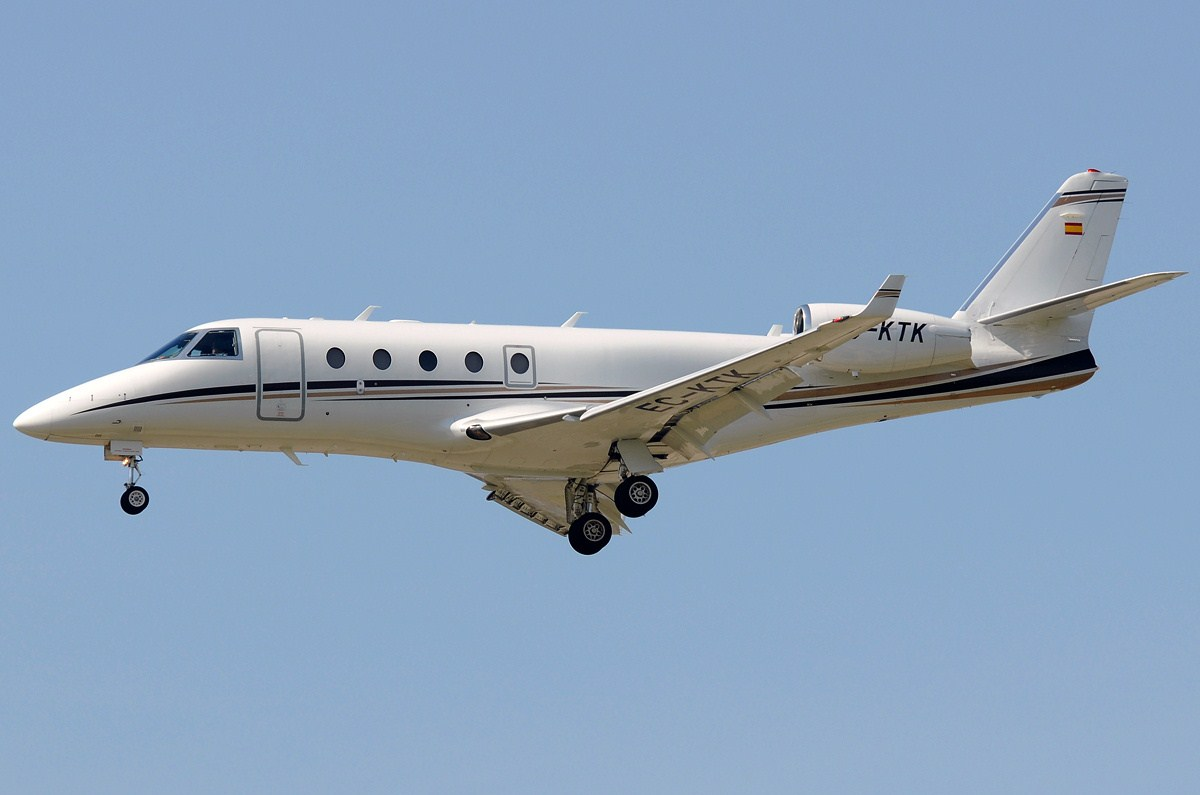
The updated G150 has a larger fuselage and a new nose

The Gulfstream G100 is a twin-engined business jet. The airframe is largely composed of aluminium and uses a conventional monocoque structure. Traditional construction using cross-sectional frames, longerons and stressed skin is harnessed. Secondary structural elements, such as the radome, baggage compartment, access doors, leading edges of the wing, multiple flight control surfaces, and (on some models) winglets, were composed of composites the comprised fiberglass, Kevlar and carbon fiber. In order to efficiently achieve a relatively high cruise speed, considerable attention was paid to minimising airframe drag, leading to the nose, windshields and fairings between the wing and the fuselage being redesigned on the G150 along with covering the flight control surface's hinges, fitting gap seals, and adopting flush door openers. A dedicated heated aft compartment was present for stowing luggage.

An enlarged fuselage is used on the G150; this comprises a single stretched section that is located just aft of the wing to optimise the airframe's balance. On account of the more rearward position of the tail unit, the G150 possesses greater stability in both pitch and yaw than the G100. The fuselage is distinctively shaped, the sidewalls being relatively flat while the upper section is arched, thus providing more headroom for the cabin's occupants than a more circular-shaped fuselage of comparable width would have permitted. Early-build aircraft were produced with rectangular cabin windows; larger oval windows were adopted for the G150. Similarly, while early aircraft were furnished with incandescents position lights, LED counterparts were fitted on the G150.

The aircraft is equipped with a first-generation supercritical wing that exhibited similar aerodynamic properties to contemporary Dassault Falcon business jets while being smaller in scale. The wing's leading edge inboard section is swept at 34 degrees while the outer leading edge has 25 degrees of sweep. Being a relatively flexible wing, it has been attributed with providing smoother flight when encountering turbulence. The structure of the wing comprises forward and rear spars, along with ribs, stressed skins, and an aft sub-spar which is a key attachment point for the aircraft's main landing gear. Fuel is stored in tanks within both the wings and the fuselage.

Almost all of the primary flight controls are manually operated, although hydraulically-powered ailerons, are manually operated. An artificial control feel system is present to simulate loads across the roll axis. The G150 is fitted with Rockwell Collins’ Pro Line 21 avionics suite.

== Operational history ==
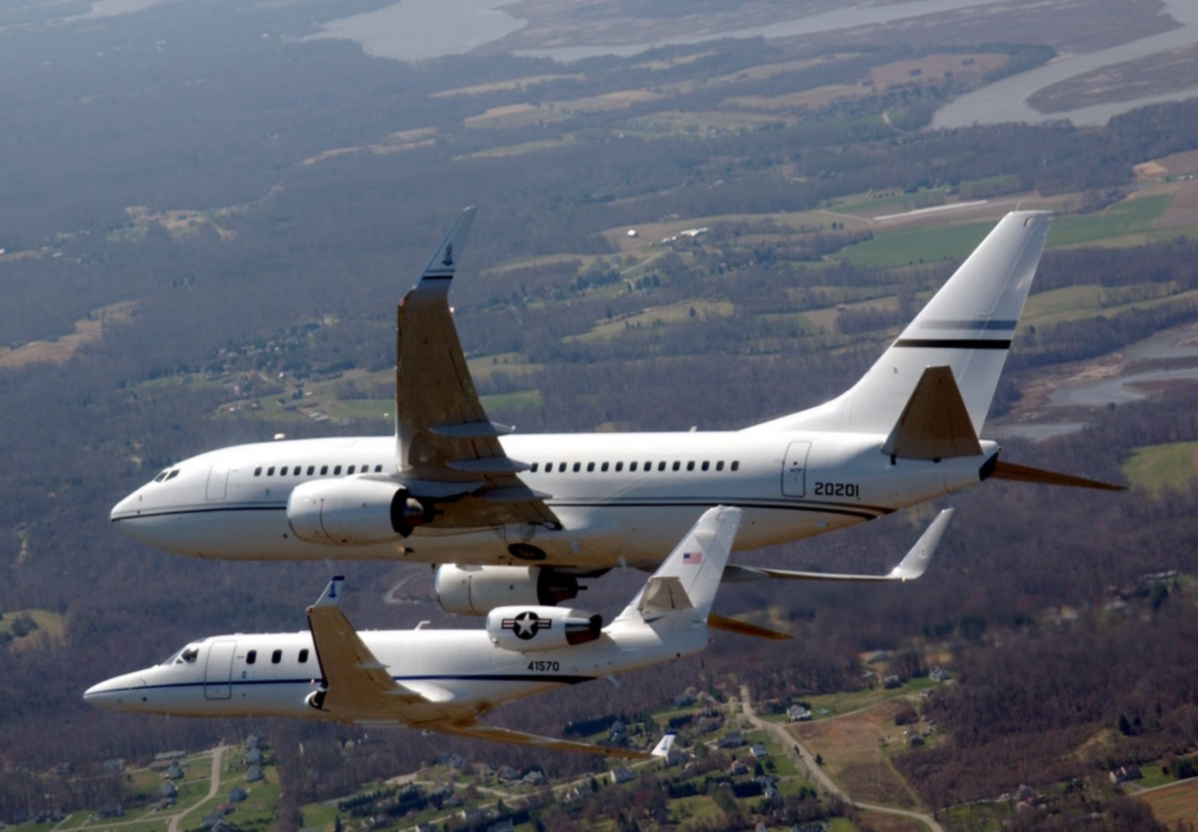
C-38A (G100) and Boeing C-40 Clipper of the United States Air National Guard

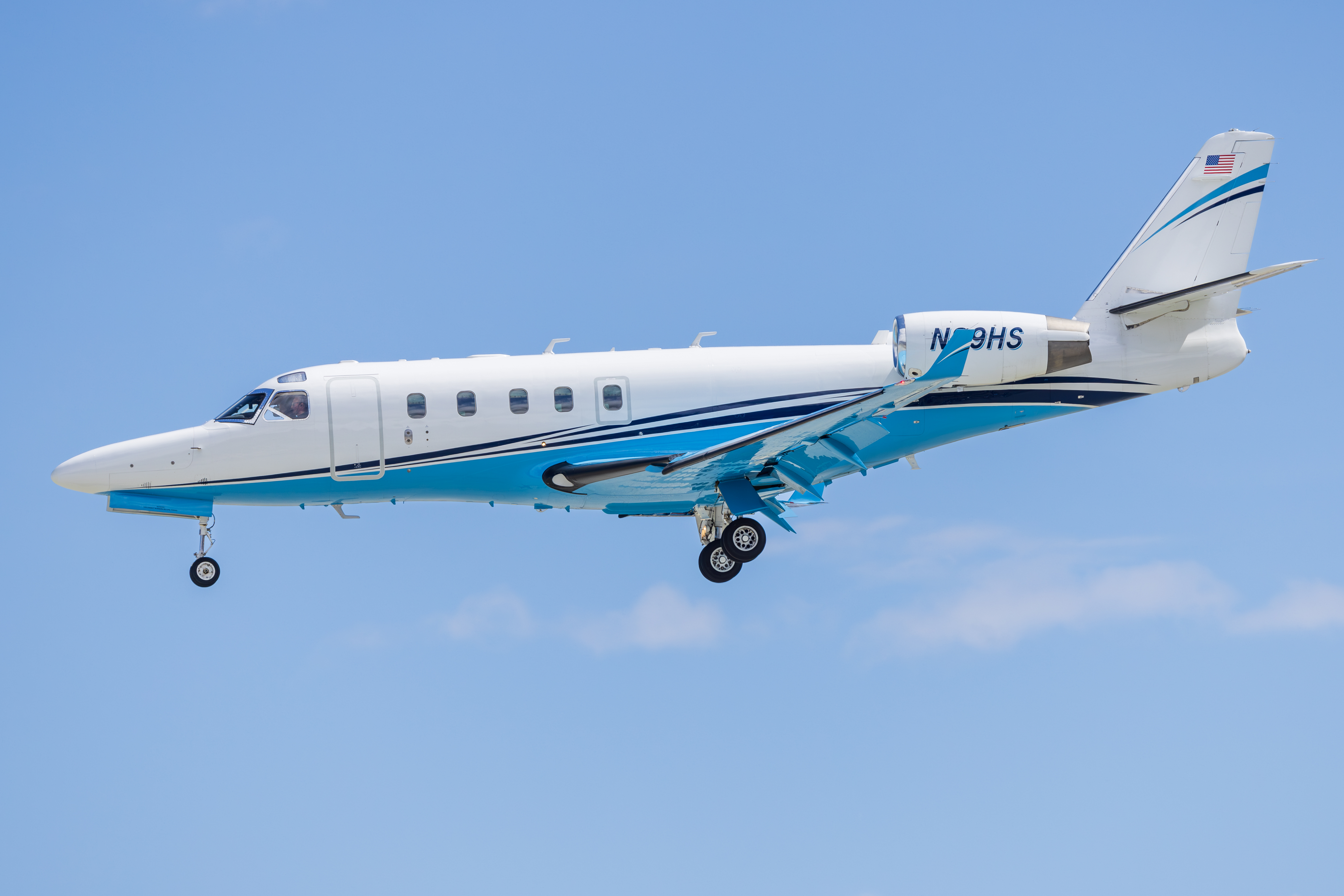
A civil-registered G100 landing at Palm Springs International Airport, 2023

In 1997, the G100 was ordered for the United States Air Force as the C-38A Courier. It differed somewhat from the standard G100, primarily via its fitting of various military avionics systems. The C-38A, which replaced the earlier Learjet C-21, was operated by the 201st Airlift Squadron at Andrews Air Force Base in Maryland until 2015.

The C-38A was also ordered for the United States Navy, replacing North American T-2 Buckeyes at Naval Air Station Patuxent River beginning in September 2015. Two aircraft remain in service as of 2023, both former 201st Airlift Squadron C-38's. The C-38 is tasked with acting as a chase plane, radar test target, and pilot proficiency aircraft for the test and evaluation squadron VX-20.

On 2 October 2012, an Astra operated by the Eritrean Air Force as the Eritrean presidential aircraft was stolen by a pair of serving Eritrean Air Force officers. The officers flew the Astra to Saudi Arabia and landed at Jizan Regional Airport, after which they requested political asylum.

== Variants ==
IAI 1125 Astra
Original version, powered by two 16.46 kilonewtons (3,700 lbf) Garrett TFE731-3A-200G turbofans. A total of 32 built.
IAI 1125 Astra SP
Version with modified aerodynamics (giving 53 nautical miles (61 mi; 98 km) increase in range), improved avionics and revised interior. A total of 36 built from 1990.
IAI 1125 Astra SPX
More powerful (18.90 kilonewtons (4,250 lbf) Honeywell TFE-731-40R-200G) engines and fitted with winglets. Increased weights and range.
Gulfstream G100
Marketing name for the IAI 1125 after the programme was taken over by Gulfstream Aerospace in 2001. A total of 77 Astra SPX and G100 aircraft were built.
Gulfstream G150
Improved version of G100 with wider and longer cabin, a revised nose and uprated (19.7 kilonewtons (4,400 lbf)) engines. Nearly 120 were in service in 2016.

== Notable accidents and incidents ==
- On March 10 2024, an IAI 1125 Astra SP registration N1125A crashed on approach to Ingalls Field Airport, Hot Springs, Virginia. It struck trees and hillside terrain short of the runway. The aircraft was owned and operated by SkyJet Elite and had 5 people on board at the time of the accident.
- On October 3, 2026, a G100 registration C-GRJP went missing on a flight from L.F. Wade International Airport, Bermuda to Logan International Airport, Boston. The aircraft was owned and operated by Latitude Air Ambulance and had six people on board. The Federal Aviation Administration lost contact with the aircraft at approximately 2am. The search was focused off the coast of Nantucket, Massachusetts.

== Operators ==
Canada

- SkyCare Air Ambulance operates one Astra SP (C-FDAX) out of Region of Waterloo International Airport base.
- Latitude Air Ambulance operates three (one lost in crash October 3, 2026) from John C. Munro Hamilton International Airport.

Eritrea

- Eritrean Air Force one 1125 Astra aircraft operated as presidential transport

India

- Indian Air Force operates two Gulfstream G100s.

Taiwan

- AIDC operates one Astra SPX aircraft as a target tug

United States

- United States Navy operates two former USAF C-38A Astra SPX
  - VX-20 – Naval Air Station Patuxent River, Maryland

== Specifications (G-100) ==
Data from Jane's All The World's Aircraft 2003–2004

General characteristics

- Crew: 2
- Capacity: 6–9 passengers
- Length: 16.94 m (55 ft 7 in)
- Wingspan: 16.64 m (54 ft 7 in) (over winglets)
- Height: 5.54 m (18 ft 2 in)
- Wing area: 29.41 m^{2} (316.6 sq ft)
- Aspect ratio: 8.8:1
- Airfoil: IAI Sigma-2
- Empty weight: 6,214 kg (13,700 lb)
- Max takeoff weight: 11,181 kg (24,650 lb)
- Fuel capacity: 4,910 L (1,300 US gal; 1,080 imp gal) usable
- Powerplant: 2 × Honeywell TFE731-40-R-200G turbofans, 18.9 kN (4,250 lbf) thrust each

Performance

- Maximum speed: Mach 0.875
- Cruise speed: 896 km/h (557 mph, 484 kn)
- Range: 5,462 km (3,394 mi, 2,949 nmi) (maximum fuel, four passengers)
- Service ceiling: 14,000 m (45,000 ft)
- Rate of climb: 19.33 m/s (3,805 ft/min)
- Fuel consumption: 1750 lb. per hour

Avionics

- Collins Pro Line 4

== See also ==
Related development

- Gulfstream G200

Aircraft of comparable role, configuration, and era

- Learjet 75
- Cessna Citation Latitude
