= IAI Westwind =

Business jet

Jet Commander/Westwind
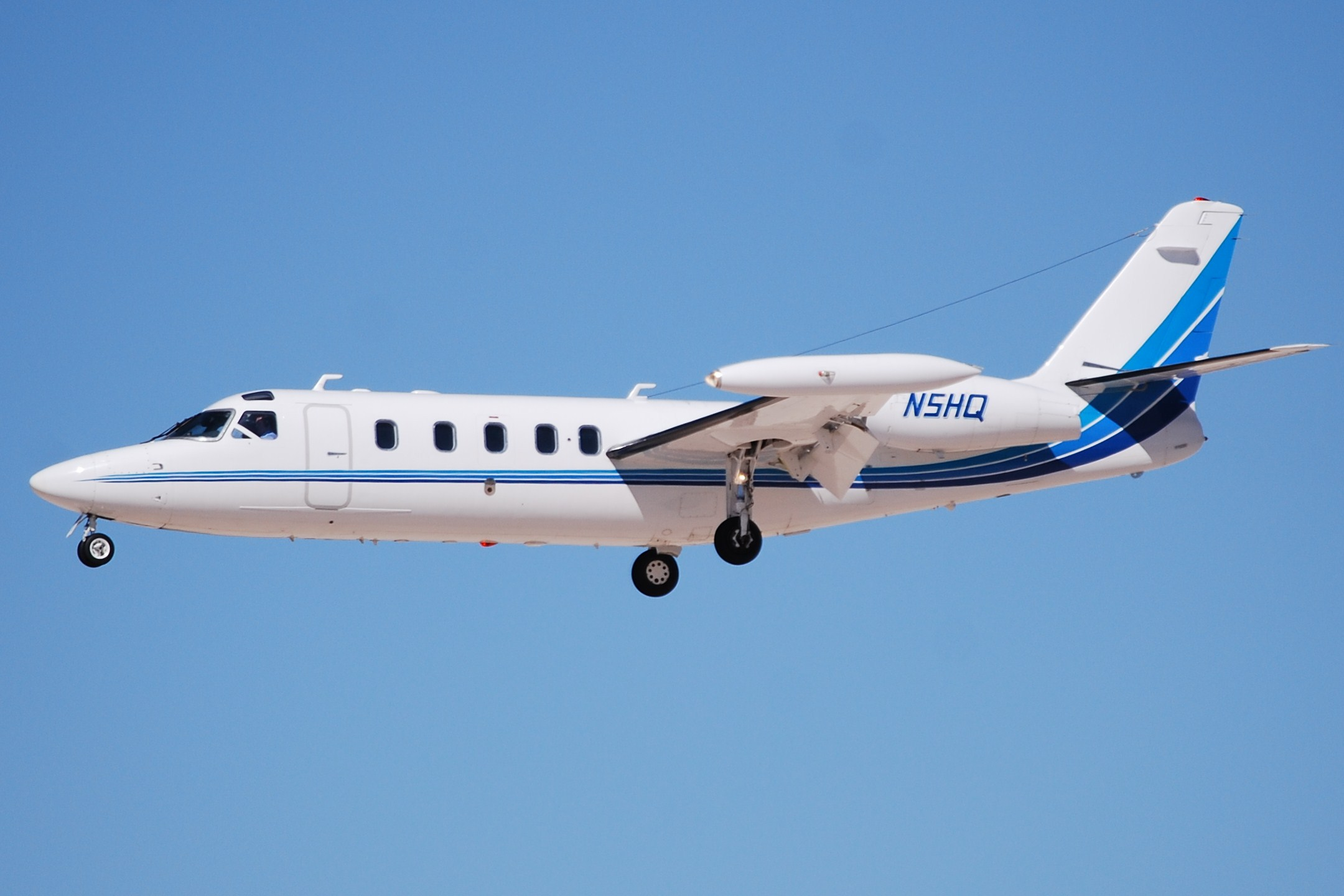
- The Westwind, a business aircraft with a mid-wing and two aft-mounted engines

General information
- Type: Business jet
- Manufacturer: Aero Commander; Israel Aircraft Industries
- Status: Limited service
- Primary user: Pel-Air
- Number built: 442

History
- Manufactured: 1965–1987
- Introduction date: 1965
- First flight: 27 January 1963
- Developed from: Aero Commander 500
- Developed into: IAI Astra; Gulfstream G100

The IAI Westwind is a business jet that was initially designed and produced by Aero Commander as the 1121 Jet Commander.

Developed as a jet-powered derivative of the successful preceding Aero Commander 500, the prototype made its maiden flight on 27 January 1963. Powered by a pair of GE CJ610 turbojets, the initial production model of the aircraft received type certification on 4 November 1964 and the first deliveries took place two months later. As a consequence of North American Rockwell's purchase of Aero Commander, the programme was promptly sold onto Israel Aircraft Industries (IAI) in 1968. In addition to continuing to produce the Westwind, IAI committed to the further development of the type. It was stretched slightly to create the 1123 Westwind, and subsequently re-engined with Garrett TFE731 turbofans to produce the 1124 Westwind. 442 aircraft were completed before production was terminated in 1987 in favour of the IAI Astra, a derivative of the Westwind.

The largest model of the aircraft, which had a 16,800–23,500 lb (7.6–10.7 t) MTOW, can carry up to ten passengers. The ovoid shape of its fuselage permitted the cabin to be larger while its low-mounted door was particularly useful to aeromedical operators. While possessing a fairly orthodox arrangement for a business jet, one unusual feature was its mid-mounted wings, which lessened the impact of turbulence. The wing is usually equipped with tip tanks; when combined with auxiliary fuel tanks, the Westwind is capable of crossing the Atlantic Ocean or the continental United States without any fuel stops and is the only light jet capable of such range. The Seascan, a dedicated maritime patrol aircraft variant of the aircraft, was operated by the Israeli Air Force (IAF) for several decades.

== Development ==
External image
- Business Machine of the Air – promotional film covering the early history of the aircraft

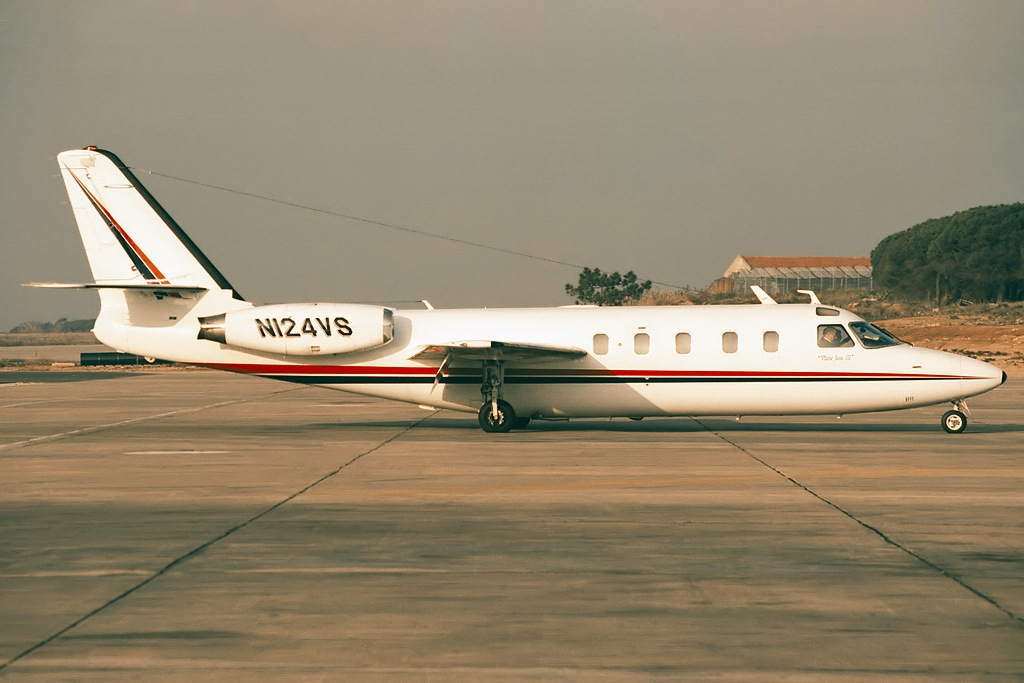
Early 1121 Jet Commanders are powered by thin CJ610 turbojets, and they have five starboard and three or four port windows.

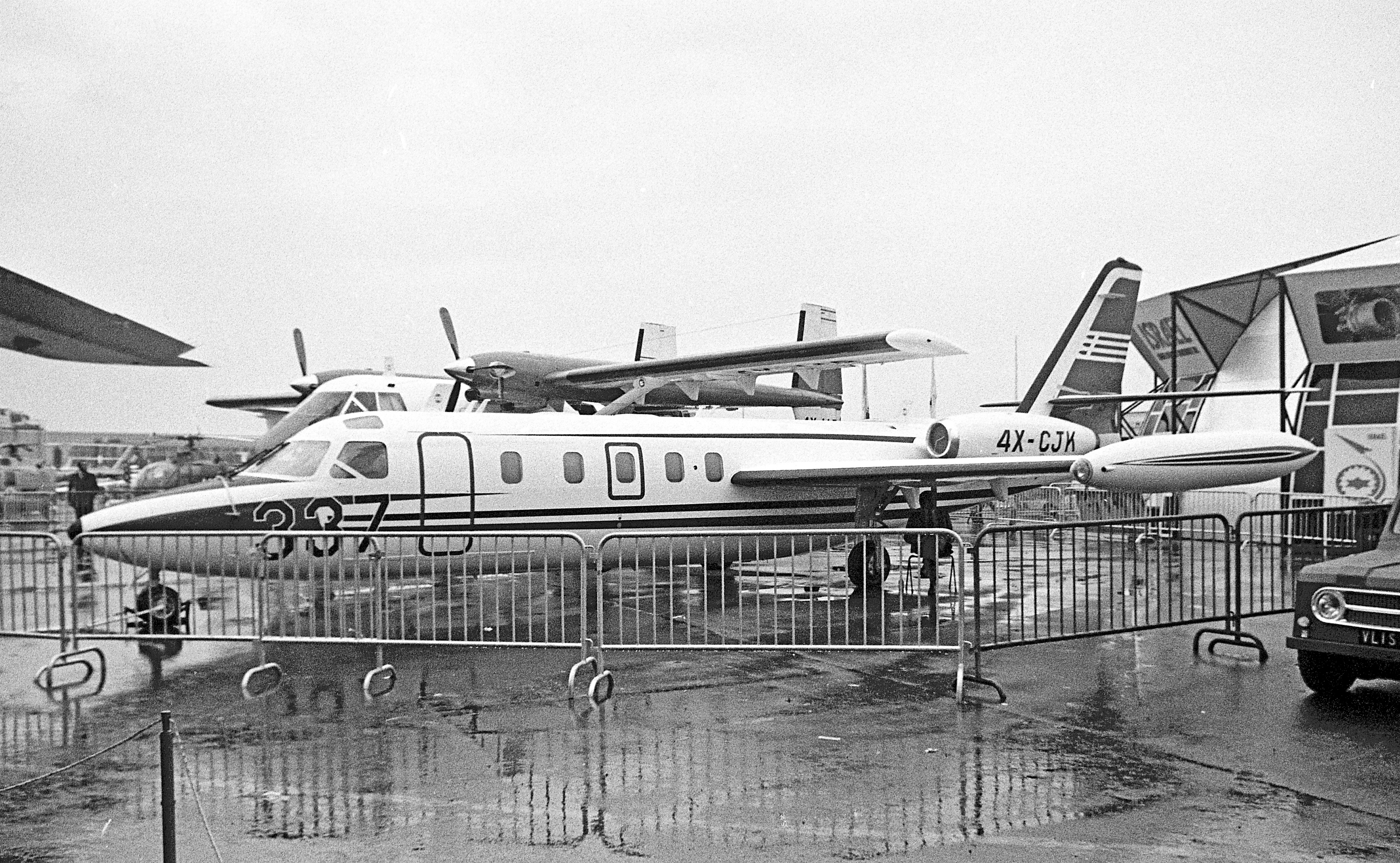
Later 1123 Westwinds are stretched by 22 in (56 cm), they have tip tanks, and six starboard and five port windows.

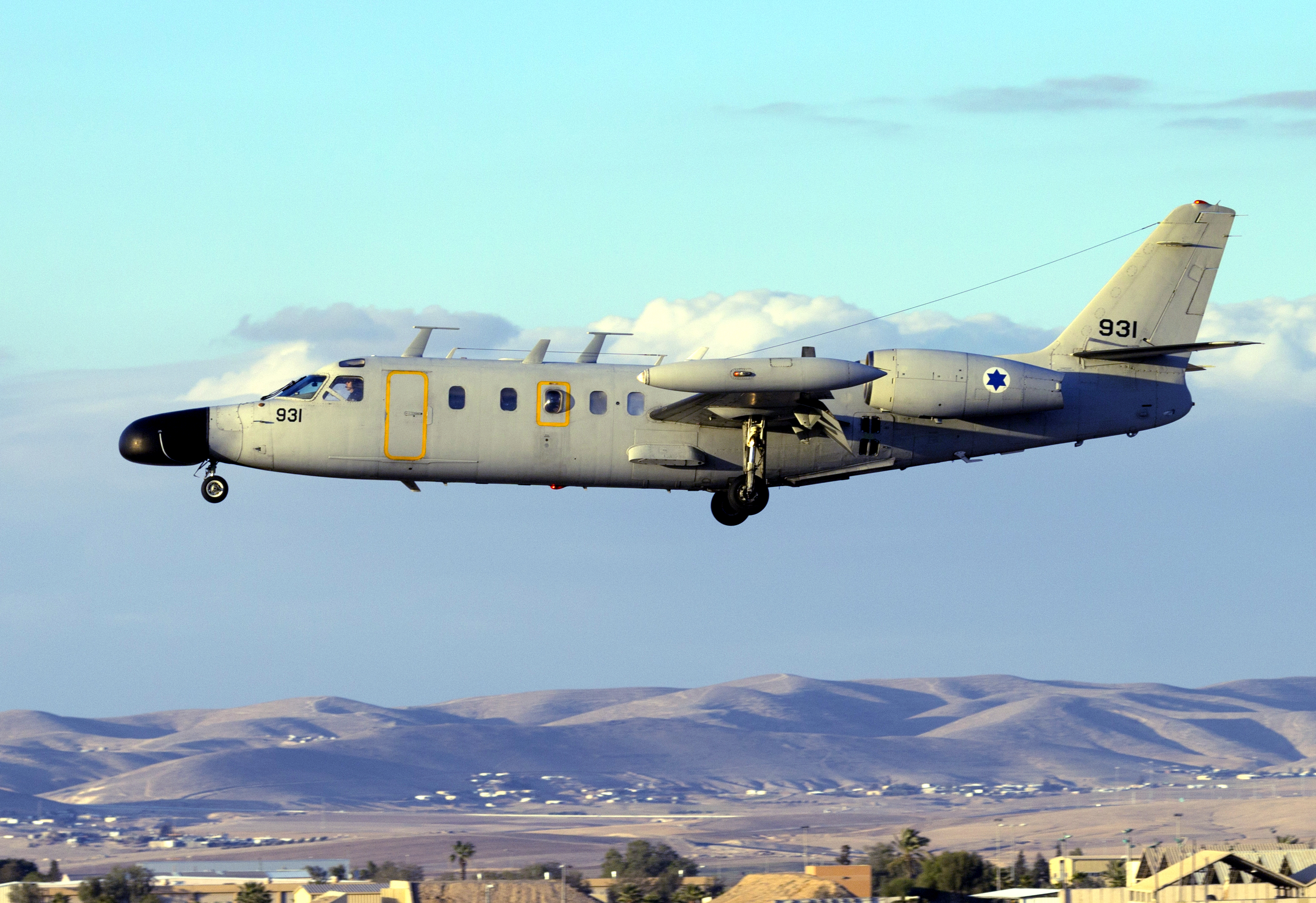
The 1124 Westwind is powered by two larger Garrett TFE731 turbofans, the Sea Scan maritime patrol aircraft of the Israeli Air Force has a nose radome and additional aerials.

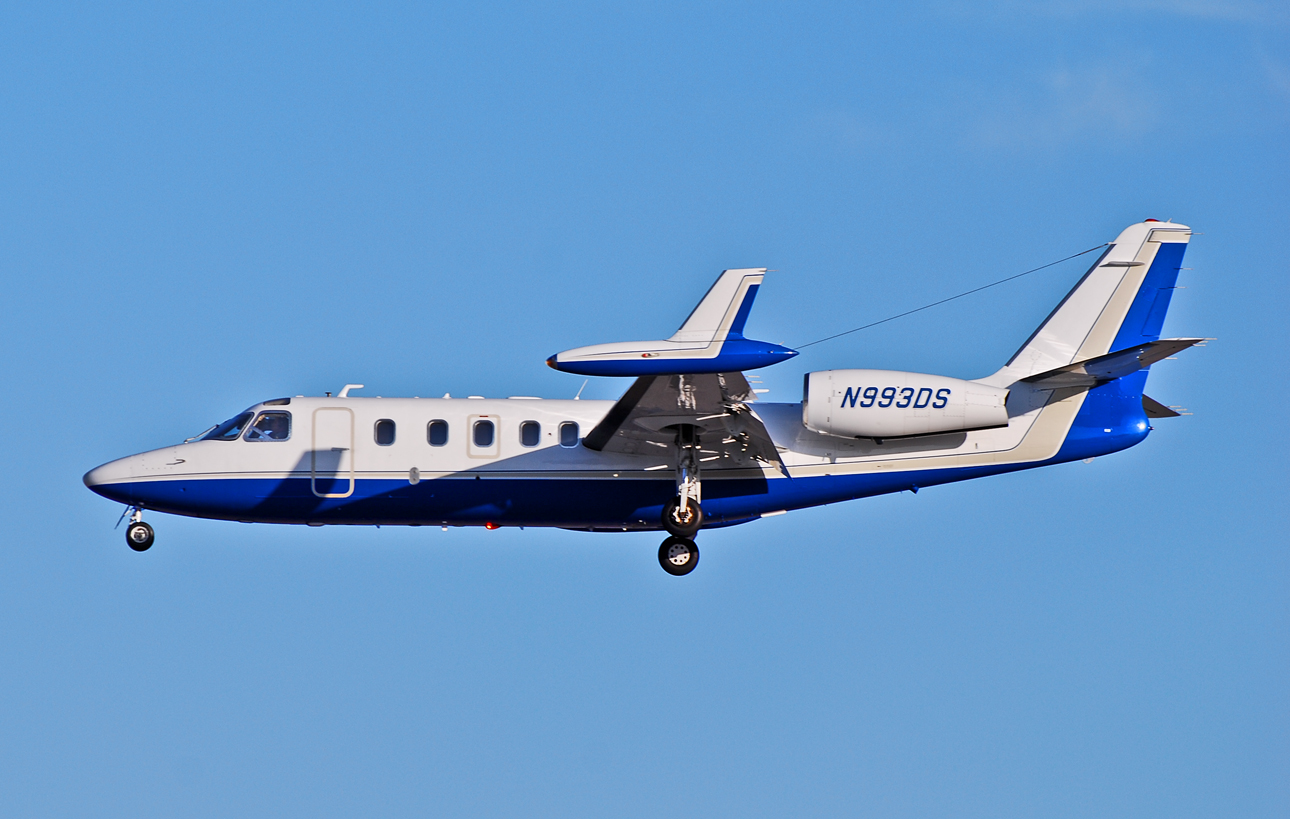
The 1124A Westwind 2 has winglets on the tip tanks.

=== Origins ===
The Westwind was originally designed in the United States by Aero Commander as a jet-powered derivative of its twin-propeller namesake aircraft. The prototype performed its maiden flight on 27 January 1963, being initially known as the Aero Commander 1121 Jet Commander. Following initial testing of this prototype, it was modified to production standard, which included the addition of 2.5 ft to the fuselage length and increased payload and maximum weights. The second prototype first flew on 14 April 1964 and was followed by the first production aircraft in November 1964. Type certification of the aircraft was received by the Federal Aviation Administration (FAA) in November of that year, enabling the first customer delivery to take place on 11 January 1965.

Shortly after deliveries of the aircraft commenced, Aero Commander was acquired by North American Rockwell. However, the Jet Commander posed an issue for this acquisition, since Rockwell were already selling an executive jet of its own design, the Sabreliner; due to antitrust laws, the company could not continue to keep both aircraft in production. Therefore, the company decided to sell off the rights to the Jet Commander; consequently, in 1968, Israel Aircraft Industries (IAI) purchased the programme, after which it was rebranded as the Westwind.

=== Under Israel Aircraft Industries ===
Jet Commander production amounted to 150 aircraft in the United States and Israel before IAI undertook a series of modifications to create the 1123 Westwind. These included stretching the fuselage and increasing maximum takeoff, maximum landing, and maximum zero-fuel weights, with the wing modified to incorporate double-slotted flaps and drooped leading edges and tip tanks. The trimmable horizontal stabiliser was also modified to have increased span and more travel. Not long after the aircraft went into production, the original General Electric CJ610 turbojet engines were replaced by more fuel-efficient Garrett TFE731 turbofans. Numerous airframe modifications also were made, such as drooped leading edges on the wings, a dorsal fin, revised engine pylons and nacelles, and further increases in maximum takeoff, maximum landing, and maximum zero-fuel weights. With improvements to a number of onboard systems incorporated, as well, these changes resulted in the 1124 Westwind, deliveries of which commenced in 1976.

In 1980, deliveries of the improved Model 1124A commenced; modifications included a new wing centre-section and the addition of winglets to the tips. This revamped aircraft, called the Westwind II, promptly replaced the original model in production. IAI constructed the final Westwind in 1987, after a total of 442 Jet Commanders and Westwinds had been built, after which production was switched to a newer derivative aircraft, the IAI Astra.

== Design ==
The Jet Commander/Westwind is of a broadly conventional arrangement for a business jet, typically being powered by a pair of turbofan engines mounted in nacelles carried on the rear fuselage aft of the rear bulkhead to lower cabin noise. Somewhat atypical for an aircraft of this class is the mounting of its wings at the mid-point of the fuselage (instead of the more common low-wing arrangement); this configuration reduces the impact of turbulence and makes the aircraft smoother in-flight. The wing is usually equipped with tip tanks, which can function as sponsons in the event of a water landing. The Westwind also possesses a strong short-field landing capability. At FL310 and Mach 0.74 (434 kn; 804 km/h), the 1124 burns 1,600 lb (730 kg) per hour, and 1,200 lb (540 kg) at Mach 0.7 (411 kn; 761 km/h). When outfitted with auxiliary fuel tanks, the range of the aircraft can be increased to 2,900 nautical miles, which made the Westwind the only light jet capable of crossing the Atlantic Ocean or the continental United States without needing to refuel.

The Westwind has a relatively spacious cabin, which was partially attributable to the design of its fuselage; specifically, it had ovoid shape, rather than a pure oval. The cabins of most models can be configured to comfortably carry up to eight passengers; options such as a three-place divan are also available. Cabin refurbishment packages are available for the type. The aircraft is furnished with a relatively low-mounted door, which has proven to be particularly attractive to aeromedical operators as it eases the loading and unloading of patients. The aircraft also has a sizable baggage compartment and a lavatory aft of the cabin. Pilots have reported instances of corrosion between the deicing boots and the leading edge of the wing, as well as along the aircraft's underside. Furthermore, rough or heavy landings of the aircraft risk damage to the fuel cells, which causes fuel leaks.

At the time of its first flight, the Westwind was provisioned with a relatively advanced cockpit for the era, being equipped with both analogue and early digital flight instrumentation. Later models have been furnished with newer avionics suites, either to increase operational efficiency or for regulatory compliance; avionics upgrade packages have also been produced for existing aircraft.

== Operational history ==
In 1976, in the wake of the terrorist takeover of the Savoy hotel in Tel Aviv, the Israeli Air Force (IAF) decided to use the Westwind as the basis for a maritime patrol aircraft, which became known as the IAI Sea Scan. It had originally been developed to meet a requirement for the United States Coast Guard (USCG) to replace the Grumman HU-16 Albatross, however, the USCG ultimately selected the Dassault Falcon instead. The Seascan, nicknamed "Seagull" (Hebrew: שחף, romanized: Shahhaf), was adopted by the service. Following the reassingment of the maritime patrol mission to the IAI Heron unmanned aerial vehicle, the IAF withdrew its last Seascan in 2017.

By 2018, a 1980s-era Westwind 1124s was typically priced from $300,000 to $700,000. The sustained low price for used examples of the type makes it relatively affordable to acquire, but allegedly puts off owners from investing into avionics upgrades or other improvements.

== Variants ==
Type certificate data sheet
	Model	Approved	Engines	Thrust	Mmo	Ceiling	MTOW	pax	fuel	Serials
Aero Commander	1121	4 November 1964	CJ610-1/-5	2,850–2,950 lbf 12.68–13.12 kN	0.765	40,000 ft 12,192 m	16,800–17,500 lb 7,620–7,938 kg	8	926 US gal 3,505 L	3-120
Aero Commander	1121A (Note: overwing refuelling points with integral fuel tanks, new wheels, tires and brakes, improved cockpit lighting)	19 September 1967	CJ610-1	2,850 lbf 12.68 kN	0.765	41,000 ft 12,497 m (Note: with passengers, 45,000 ft (13,716 m) with crew only)	17,500 lb 7,938 kg	8	1,090 US gal 4,126 L	121-131
Aero Commander	1121B	23 April 1968	CJ610-5	2,950 lbf 13.12 kN	0.765	41,000 ft 12,497 m	17,500 lb 7,938 kg	8	1,090 US gal 4,126 L	132-150
IAI	1123 (Note: Increased fuselage length, tip tanks, double-slotted flaps and drooped leading edge, Increased horizontal tail span...)	8 December 1971	CJ610-9 (Note: plus Microturbo SAPHIR III APU)	3,100 lbf 13.79 kN	0.765	41,000 ft 12,497 m	20,700 lb 9,389 kg	10	1,300 US gal 4,921 L	36 built
IAI	1124 (Note: Improved drooped leading edge, added dorsal fin, new pod and pylon shapes, new wheel well fairing...)	17 March 1976	TFE-731-3-1G	3,700 lbf 16.46 kN	0.765	45,000 ft 13,716 m	23,500 lb 10,659 kg	10	1,400 US gal 5,300 L	
IAI	1124A (Note: winglets on the wing tip tanks, New leading edge profile)	17 April 1980	TFE-731-3-1G	3,700 lbf 16.46 kN	0.785	45,000 ft 13,716 m	23,500 lb 10,659 kg	10	1,400 US gal 5,300 L	

The 1122 Type Certificate was cancelled, the two airplanes manufactured have been converted to model 1123. The 1124N Sea Scan is a maritime surveillance aircraft, and the 1124 was renamed Westwind I after the introduction of the 1124A Westwind II. The 1121C is an unofficial designation for 1121 aircraft modified under a Supplemental Type Certificate with an increased all-up weight available from 1971. The 1123 Westwind was stretched by 22 in (56 cm).

== Operators ==
=== Civil operators ===
Australia

- Pel-Air: six, of which four are in aero medical configuration.
- Medex Aero: three, two of which are in aero medical configuration and one in corporate configuration

Canada

- Discovery Air Defence
- SkyCare Air Ambulance

Brazil

- Brasil Vida Táxi Aéreo: four aircraft, two in aero medical configuration

Fiji

- Helipro Fiji: one aircraft is in aero medical configuration.

Philippines

- Lionair

United States

- Avalair Aircraft Management
- Federal Aviation Administration
- Nomadic Aviation Group
- North Country Aviation

=== Military operators ===
Chile

- Chilean Navy

Ecuador

- Ecuadorian Air Force

Honduras

- Honduran Air Force - one 1123 operated during 1976.

Israel

- Israeli Air Force (inactive as of 2017)

Mexico

- Mexican Air Force: Inactive

Panama

- Panamanian Air Force - one 1123 delivered in 1975

Uganda

- Ugandan Air Force - one 1121N operated from 1971 to 1976 as a presidential aircraft.

United States

- United States Coast Guard - one 1123 leased in 1973 for evaluation

== Accidents and incidents ==
The Rockwell 1121 had 21 hull-loss accidents causing 45 fatalities, and the IAI 1124 had 25 hull-loss accidents causing 47 fatalities.

- On December 16, 1969, an Aero Commander 1121 Jet Commander operated by American Smelting and Refining Co. lifted off prematurely, stalled and crashed. Both occupants died.
- On 14 November 1970, an Aero Commander 1121 Jet Commander operated by Royal Crown Cola Corp. impacted terrain at a steep angle during a missed approach procedure possibly caused by spatial disorientation, low ceiling and rain. Both occupants were killed.
- On 25 September 1973, a Rockwell 1121B Jet Commander (N200RC) owned by Continental Jet Corp. was damaged beyond repair in a hangar fire.
- On 21 September 1992, an Air Sweden IAI-1124 Westwind registered as SE-DLK was destroyed by a fire. The plane was departing to Arvidsjaur when takeoff was aborted due to an engine failure. None of the seven occupants were killed or injured, but the aircraft was written off.
- On 15 December 1993, a chartered IAI Westwind business jet carrying two flight crew members and three passengers (including Rich Snyder, president of In-N-Out Burger), crashed while on approach to John Wayne Airport. All five occupants were killed in the crash. The aircraft, which departed Brackett Field, 30 miles to the north in La Verne, followed a Boeing 757 for landing, became caught in the 757's wake turbulence, rolled into a deep descent, and crashed near the intersection of State Route 55 and Edinger Avenue. The crash investigation led to the FAA requirement for an adequate period between heavy aircraft and following light aircraft to allow wake turbulence to diminish.
- On 27 April 1995, a Pel-Air IAI 1124 Westwind operating a cargo flight from Tindal Airport crashed into the Ilparpa Range while attempting an instrument approach for runway 12, killing the two pilots and a company passenger.
- On 8 November 2002: An IAI 1124A Westwind, registration number N61RS, crashed during an Instrument Landing System (ILS) approach, killing both pilots. The accident was attributed to "The pilot's inadvertent flight into mountain wave weather conditions while IMC, resulting in a loss of aircraft control."
- On 2 July 2004, an IAI Westwind operated by Air Tek crashed after takeoff and eventually came to rest inside an empty hangar. All six occupants were killed, along with an airport worker on the ground.
- On 18 June 2014, an IAI Westwind corporate aircraft crashed upon takeoff, killing all three on board.
- On 29 March, 2020, an air ambulance operated by Lionair, caught fire and exploded during take off at Manila Airport, killing all five passengers and three crew.

== Specifications (1124A Westwind II) ==
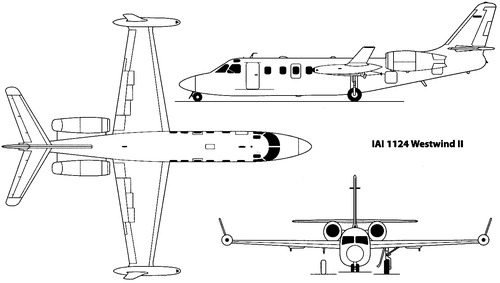
IAI Westwind II

Data from Jane's All The World's Aircraft 1982-83

General characteristics

- Crew: 2
- Capacity: seven passenger in a typical configuration, up to 10 passengers in a high-density configuration / 1,474 kg (3,250 lb) maximum payload
- Length: 15.93 m (52 ft 3 in)
- Wingspan: 13.65 m (44 ft 9 in) , 13.16 m (43 ft) excluding tip tanks
- Height: 4.81 m (15 ft 9 in)
- Wing area: 28.64 m^{2} (308.3 sq ft)
- Aspect ratio: 6.51
- Airfoil: IAI 54-12 (Sigma 1 modified)
- Empty weight: 4,536 kg (10,000 lb)
- Max takeoff weight: 10,660 kg (23,501 lb)
- Fuel capacity: 4,345 kg (9,579 lb)
- Powerplant: 2 × Honeywell TFE731-3-1G turbofan engines, 16.46 kN (3,700 lbf) thrust each

Performance

- Cruise speed: 723 km/h (449 mph, 390 kn) economical at 11,890–12,500 m (39,000–41,000 ft)
- Stall speed: 184 km/h (114 mph, 99 kn) at maximum landing weight, flaps down, engines idling
- Never exceed speed: 868 km/h (539 mph, 469 kn) at 8,840 m (29,000 ft)
- Range: 4,430 km (2,750 mi, 2,390 nmi) while carrying 10 passenger; 5,385 km (3,346 mi; 2,908 nmi) with maximum fuel and four passengers
- Service ceiling: 13,725 m (45,000 ft)
- Rate of climb: 25.4 m/s (5,000 ft/min) at sea level
- Wing loading: 372 kg/m^{2} (76 lb/sq ft)
- Thrust/weight: 0.31
- Take-off balanced field length: 1,600 m (5,200 ft)
- Landing run from 15 m (49 ft): 747 m (2,450 ft) at maximum landing weight

== See also ==
- Aero Commander 500
- British Aerospace 125
- Hamburger Flugzeugbau HFB 320 Hansa Jet
- Piaggio PD.808
- Learjet 35/36
- Cessna Citation III
