= List of United States Air Force lieutenant generals from 2010 to 2019 =

Flag of an Air Force lieutenant general

The rank of lieutenant general (or three-star general) is the second-highest rank normally achievable in the United States Air Force, and the first to have a specified number of appointments set by statute. It ranks above major general (two-star general) and below general (four-star general).

There have been 131 lieutenant generals in the U.S. Air Force from 2010 to 2019, 33 of whom were elevated to four-star general. All 131 achieved that rank while on active duty in the U.S. Air Force. Lieutenant generals entered the Air Force via several paths: 61 were commissioned via the U.S. Air Force Academy (USAFA), 44 via Air Force Reserve Officer Training Corps (AFROTC) at a civilian university, 13 via Air Force Officer Training School (OTS), seven via AFROTC at a senior military college, five via direct commission (direct), and one via direct commission inter-service transfer from the Army National Guard (ARNG).

== List of generals ==
Entries in the following list of lieutenant generals are indexed by the numerical order in which each officer was promoted to that rank while on active duty, or by an asterisk (*) if the officer did not serve in that rank while on active duty in the U.S. Air Force or was promoted to four-star rank while on active duty in the U.S. Air Force. Each entry lists the general's name, date of rank, (Note: Dates of rank are taken, where available, from the U.S. Air Force register of active and retired commissioned officers, or from the officer's official Air Force biography. The date listed is that of the officer's first promotion to lieutenant general. If such a date cannot be found, the next date substituted should be that of the officer's assumption of his/her first three-star appointment. Failing which, the officer's first Senate confirmation date to lieutenant general should be substituted.) active-duty positions held while serving at three-star rank, (Note: Positions listed are those held by the officer when promoted to lieutenant general. Dates listed are for the officer's full tenure, which may predate promotion to three-star rank or postdate retirement from active duty. Positions held in an acting capacity are italicized.) number of years of active-duty service at three-star rank (Yrs), (Note: The number of years of active-duty service at three-star rank is approximated by subtracting the year in the "Date of rank" column from the last year in the "Position" column. Time spent between active-duty three-star assignments is not counted.) year commissioned and source of commission, (Note: Sources of commission are listed in parentheses after the year of commission and include: the United States Air Force Academy (USAFA); the United States Military Academy (USMA); the United States Naval Academy (USNA); Reserve Officer Training Corps (ROTC) at a civilian university; Air Force Reserve Officer Training Corps (AFROTC) at a civilian university; ROTC or AFROTC at a senior military college such as Texas A&M University (Texas A&M), the Virginia Military Institute (VMI), or Virginia Polytechnic Institute and State University (VPI); Air Force Officer Training School (OTS); and direct commission (direct).) number of years in commission when promoted to three-star rank (YC), (Note: The number of years in commission before being promoted to three-star rank is approximated by subtracting the year in the "Commission" column from the year in the "Date of rank" column.) and other biographical notes (years of birth and death are shown in parentheses in the Notes column). (Note: Notes include years of birth and death; awards of the Medal of Honor, Congressional Gold Medal, Presidential Medal of Freedom, or honors of similar significance; major government appointments; university presidencies or equivalents; familial relationships with other significant military officers or significant government officials such as U.S. Presidents, cabinet secretaries, U.S. Senators, or state governors; and unusual career events such as premature relief or death in office. Officers who served as enlisted airmen for 7 years or more prior to commissioning are also noted.) Officers transferred to the U.S. Space Force in the grade of lieutenant general are included while having previously held that rank in the Air Force previously are included, while Air Force officers first promoted to lieutenant general in the U.S. Space Force are excluded.

List of U.S. Air Force lieutenant generals from 2010 to 2019
#	Name	Photo	Date of rank	Position	Yrs	Commission	YC	Notes
1	Richard C. Harding		2 Feb 2010	Judge Advocate General, U.S. Air Force (AF/JA), 2010–2014.	4	1980 (direct)	30	(1947– ) (Note: Promoted directly from rank of brigadier general.)
*	Larry O. Spencer		3 Apr 2010	Director, Force Structure, Resources and Assessment, Joint Staff, J8, 2010–2012.	2	1980 (OTS)	30	(1954– ) (Note: Served as Vice Chief of Staff, U.S. Air Force (VCSAF).) Promoted to general, 27 Jul 2012. Served 9 years in the enlisted ranks before receiving his commission in 1980.
2	Eric E. Fiel		11 Jun 2010	Vice Commander, U.S. Special Operations Command (VCDRUSSOCOM), 2010–2011.; Commander, Air Force Special Operations Command (COMAFSOC), 2011–2014.	4	1981 (OTS)	29	(1958– )
3	Frank J. Kisner		26 Jul 2010	Commander, NATO Special Operations Headquarters (CDRNSHQ), 2010–2013.	3	1980 (USAFA)	30	
4	Stephen P. Mueller		6 Sep 2010	Vice Commander, U.S. Air Forces in Europe (VCOMUSAFE), 2010–2012.; Inspector General, U.S. Air Force (AF/IG), 2012–2014.	4	1979 (USAFA)	31	(1960– )
5	Douglas H. Owens		9 Sep 2010	Vice Commander, Air Education and Training Command (VCOMAETC), 2010–2013.	3	1980 (USAFA)	30	
6	Michael R. Moeller		7 Oct 2010	U.S. Security Coordinator for Israel and the Palestinian National Authority (USSC), 2010–2012.; Deputy Chief of Staff, Strategic Plans and Programs, Air Staff (DCS A5/8), 2012–2014.	4	1980 (USAFA)	30	
7	Burton M. Field		25 Oct 2010	Commander, U.S. Forces Japan/Commander, Fifth Air Force (COMUSFJ), 2010–2012.; Deputy Chief of Staff, Operations, Plans and Requirements, Air Staff (DCS A3), 2012–2014.	4	1979 (USAFA)	31	(c. 1957– )
8	Kurt A. Cichowski		16 Nov 2010	Associate Director, Military Affairs, Central Intelligence Agency (ADMA), 2010–2013.	3	1977 (USAFA)	33	(1955– )
9	Stanley T. Kresge		10 Dec 2010	Commander, Thirteenth Air Force (Air Forces Pacific)/Commander, Joint Task Force-Support Forces Antarctica (CDRJTF-SFA), 2010–2012.; Vice Commander, Pacific Air Forces (VCOMPACAF), 2012–2014.	4	1980 (USAFA)	30	
10	Darrell D. Jones		14 Dec 2010	Deputy Chief of Staff, Manpower, Personnel and Services, Air Staff (DCS A1), 2010–2013.	3	1979 (AFROTC)	31	
11	James M. Kowalski		6 Jan 2011	Commander, Air Force Global Strike Command (COMAFGSC), 2011–2013.; Deputy Commander, U.S. Strategic Command (DCDRUSSTRATCOM), 2013–2015.	4	1980 (AFROTC)	31	(1957– )
12	Susan J. Helms		21 Jan 2011	Commander, Fourteenth Air Force (Air Forces Strategic)/Commander, Joint Functional Component Command for Space (COMAFSTRAT/CDRJFCC Space), 2011–2014.	3	1980 (USAFA)	31	(1958– ) (Note: Commissioned into Air Force as second lieutenant, 1980–1990; on active duty under NASA, 1990–2002; on active duty with Air Force, 2002–2014.) (Note: Nomination as Vice Commander, Air Force Space Command withdrawn, 2013.)
13	Michael J. Basla		2 Mar 2011	Vice Commander, Air Force Space Command (VCOMAFSPC), 2009–2012.; Chief, Information Dominance/Chief Information Officer, Office of the Secretary of the Air Force (SAF/CIO A6), 2012–2014.	3	1979 (OTS)	32	(1952– )
*	Ellen M. Pawlikowski		3 Jun 2011	Commander, Space and Missile Systems Center/Program Executive Officer, Space (COMSMC/PEO Space), 2011–2014.; Military Deputy to the Assistant Secretary of the Air Force for Acquisition (MILDEP SAF/AQ), 2014–2015.	4	1978 (AFROTC)	33	(1956– ) Promoted to general, 8 Jun 2015.
14	Bradley A. Heithold		19 Jul 2011	Vice Commander, U.S. Special Operations Command (VCDRUSSOCOM), 2011–2014.; Commander, Air Force Special Operations Command (COMAFSOC), 2014–2016.; Principal Deputy Director, Cost Assessment and Program Evaluation, Office of the Secretary of Defense, 2016–2018.	7	1981 (AFROTC)	30	(1956– ) Served 7 years in the enlisted ranks before receiving his commission in 1981.
*	David L. Goldfein		3 Aug 2011	Commander, U.S. Air Forces Central Command/Combined Forces Air Component Commander, U.S. Central Command (COMUSAFCENT/CFACC), 2011–2013.; Director, Joint Staff (DJS), 2013–2015.	4	1983 (USAFA)	28	(1959– ) (Note: Served as Chief of Staff, U.S. Air Force (CSAF).) Promoted to general, 17 Aug 2015. Brother of Air Force major general Stephen M. Goldfein.
15	David S. Fadok		12 Aug 2011	Commander/President, Air University (COM/Pres. AU), 2011–2014.	3	1982 (USAFA)	29	
16	Stanley E. Clarke III		31 Aug 2011	Commander, First Air Force (Air Forces Northern)/Commander, Continental U.S. NORAD Region (COMAFNORTH/CDRCONR), 2011–2013.; Director, Air National Guard (DIRANG), 2013–2015.	4	1981 (AFROTC)	30	
17	Charles R. Davis		1 Sep 2011	Commander, Electronic Systems Center/Program Executive Officer, Command and Control and Combat Support (COMESC/PEO C2S), 2011–2012.; Military Deputy to the Assistant Secretary of the Air Force for Acquisition (MILDEP SAF/AQ), 2012–2014.	3	1979 (USAFA)	32	
18	Brooks L. Bash		9 Sep 2011	Director, Logistics, Joint Staff, J4, 2011–2013.; Vice Commander, Air Mobility Command (VCOMAMC), 2013–2015.	4	1981 (USAFA)	30	
19	Mark F. Ramsay		23 Sep 2011	Commander, Eighteenth Air Force (Air Forces Transportation), 2011–2012.; Director, Force Structure, Resources and Assessment, Joint Staff, J8, 2012–2015.	4	1982 (OTS)	29	(c. 1958– )
20	C. D. Moore II		3 Oct 2011	Vice Commander, Air Force Materiel Command (VCOMAFMC), 2011–2012.; Commander, Air Force Life Cycle Management Center (COMAFLCMC), 2012–2014.	3	1980 (USAFA)	31	(1958– )
21	Stephen L. Hoog		7 Nov 2011	Commander, Alaskan NORAD Region/Commander, Alaskan Command/Commander, Eleventh Air Force (CDRANR/CDRALCOM), 2011–2013.; Assistant Vice Chief of Staff, U.S. Air Force/Director, Air Staff, U.S. Air Force (AVCSAF/AF/DS), 2013–2015.	4	1979 (USAFA)	32	
22	John W. Hesterman III		17 Nov 2011	Military Deputy for Readiness to the Under Secretary of Defense for Personnel and Readiness (MILDEP USD(P&R)), 2011–2013.; Commander, U.S. Air Forces Central Command/Combined Forces Air Component Commander, U.S. Central Command (COMUSAFCENT/CFACC), 2013–2015.; Assistant Vice Chief of Staff, U.S. Air Force/Director, Air Staff, U.S. Air Force (AVCSAF/AF/DS), 2015–2016.	5	1983 (USAFA)	28	(c. 1964– ) Relieved, 2016.
*	Robin Rand		1 Dec 2011	Commander, Twelfth Air Force (Air Forces Southern), 2011–2013.	2	1979 (USAFA)	32	(1957– ) (Note: First nomination as commander, Twelfth Air Force (Air Forces Southern) returned to the President, 2010.) Promoted to general, 10 Oct 2013.
23	Judith A. Fedder		5 Dec 2011	Deputy Chief of Staff for Logistics, Installations and Mission Support, Air Staff (DCS A4/7), 2011–2015.	4	1980 (AFROTC)	31	(1958– )
24	Jan-Marc Jouas		6 Jan 2012	Deputy Commander, United Nations Command/Deputy Commander, U.S. Forces Korea/Commander, Air Component Command, ROK/U.S. Combined Forces Command/Commander, Seventh Air Force (DCDRUNC/DCDRUSFK/AIRCDRCFC), 2012–2014.	2	1979 (USAFA)	33	
25	Ronnie D. Hawkins Jr.		11 Jan 2012	Director, Defense Information Systems Agency (DIRDISA), 2012–2015.; Director, Defense Information Systems Agency/Commander, Joint Force Headquarters – Department of Defense Information Network (DIRDISA/CDRJFHQ-DoDIN), 2015.	3	1977 (AFROTC)	35	(1955– ) President, Angelo State University, 2020–present.
26	Craig A. Franklin		30 Mar 2012	Commander, Third Air Force (Air Forces Europe)/Commander, Seventeenth Expeditionary Air Force, 2012–2014.	2	1981 (USAFA)	31	(c. 1961– ) (Note: Resigned, April 2014, and retired as major general.) Resigned, 2014.
*	John E. Hyten		18 May 2012	Vice Commander, Air Force Space Command (VCOMAFSPC), 2012–2014.	2	1981 (AFROTC)	31	(1959– ) (Note: Served as a combatant commander (CCDR).) (Note: Served as Vice Chairman, Joint Chiefs of Staff (VJCS).) Promoted to general, 15 Aug 2014.
27	Bruce A. Litchfield		10 Jul 2012	Commander, Air Force Sustainment Center (COMAFSC), 2012–2015.	3	1981 (Norwich)	31	
28	Thomas W. Travis		13 Jul 2012	Surgeon General, U.S. Air Force (AF/SG), 2012–2015.	3	1976 (Virginia Tech)	36	(1953– ) Senior Vice President, Uniformed Services University of the Health Sciences, 2016–2021.
29	Salvatore A. Angelella		20 Jul 2012	Commander, U.S. Forces Japan/Commander, Fifth Air Force (COMUSFJ), 2012–2015.	3	1981 (USAFA)	31	(c. 1959– )
30	Andrew E. Busch		20 Jul 2012	Vice Commander, Air Force Materiel Command (VCOMAFMC), 2012–2014.; Director, Defense Logistics Agency (DIRDLA), 2014–2017.	5	1979 (USAFA)	33	
31	James F. Jackson		30 Jul 2012	Chief, Air Force Reserve/Commander, Air Force Reserve Command (CAFR/COMAFRC), 2012–2016.	4	1978 (USAFA)	34	(1948– )
32	Noel T. Jones		3 Aug 2012	Vice Commander, U.S. Air Forces in Europe (VCOMUSAFE), 2012–2015.	3	1980 (USAFA)	32	
*	Darren W. McDew		6 Aug 2012	Commander, Eighteenth Air Force (Air Forces Transportation), 2012–2014.	2	1982 (VMI)	30	(1960– ) Promoted to general, 5 May 2014.
33	Michael D. Dubie		14 Aug 2012	Deputy Commander, U.S. Northern Command/Vice Commander, U.S. Element, North American Aerospace Defense Command (DCDRUSNORTHCOM/VCDRNORAD), 2012–2015.	3	1982 (ARNG) (Note: Commissioned as armor officer, 1981; transferred from Army National Guard, 1982.)	30	(1960– )
*	Joseph L. Lengyel		18 Aug 2012	Vice Chief, National Guard Bureau (VCNGB), 2012–2016.	4	1981 (AFROTC)	31	(1959– ) (Note: Served as Chief, National Guard Bureau (CNGB).) Promoted to general, 3 Aug 2016.
34	Christopher C. Bogdan		6 Dec 2012	Program Executive Officer, F-35 Lightning II Joint Program Office (PEO F-35), 2012–2017.	5	1983 (USAFA)	29	
35	Gregory A. Biscone		12 Jan 2013	Commander, Office of the Defense Representative, U.S. Embassy Pakistan, 2013–2014.; Inspector General, U.S. Air Force (AF/IG), 2014–2016.	3	1981 (USAFA)	32	
36	William H. Etter		7 Mar 2013	Commander, First Air Force (Air Forces Northern)/Commander, Continental U.S. NORAD Region (COMAFNORTH/CDRCONR), 2013–2016.	3	1979 (AFROTC)	34	(c. 1957– )
*	Lori J. Robinson		20 May 2013	Vice Commander, Air Combat Command (VCOMACC), 2013–2014.	1	1981 (AFROTC)	32	(c. 1959– ) (Note: Served as Commander, North American Aerospace Defense Command (CDRNORAD).) Promoted to general, 16 Oct 2014.
37	Robert P. Otto		24 Jun 2013	Deputy Chief of Staff, Intelligence, Surveillance, and Reconnaissance, Air Staff (DCS A2), 2013–2016.	3	1982 (USAFA)	31	
*	James M. Holmes		2 Aug 2013	Vice Commander, Air Education and Training Command (VCOMAETC), 2013–2014.; Deputy Chief of Staff, Strategic Plans and Requirements, Air Staff (DCS A5/8), 2014–2017.	4	1981 (OTS)	32	(1957– ) Promoted to general, 10 Mar 2017.
38	Russell J. Handy		9 Aug 2013	Commander, Alaskan NORAD Region/Commander, Alaskan Command/Commander, Eleventh Air Force (CDRANR/CDRALCOM), 2013–2016.; Commander, Pacific Air Forces/Air Component Commander for U.S. Pacific Command/Executive Director, Pacific Air Combat Operations Staff (COMPACAF/AIRCDRUSPACOM/EXDIRPACOPS), 2016.	3	1982 (AFROTC)	31	
39	Michelle D. Johnson		12 Aug 2013	Superintendent, U.S. Air Force Academy, 2013–2017.	4	1981 (USAFA)	32	(c. 1959– ) First woman to command the U.S. Air Force Academy.
40	Mark O. Schissler		30 Aug 2013	Deputy Chairman, NATO Military Committee (DCMC), 2013–2016.	3	1981 (OTS)	32	
*	Tod D. Wolters		24 Sep 2013	Commander, Twelfth Air Force (Air Forces Southern), 2013–2014.; Deputy Chief of Staff, Operations, Air Staff (DCS A3), 2014–2015.; Director, Operations, Joint Staff, J3, 2015–2016.	3	1982 (USAFA)	31	(1960– ) (Note: Served as Supreme Allied Commander Europe (SACEUR).) Promoted to general, 11 Aug 2016. Son of Air Force brigadier general Thomas E. Wolters.
41	Douglas J. Robb		1 Oct 2013	Director, Defense Health Agency (DIRDHA), 2013–2015.	2	1979 (USAFA)	34	
*	Stephen W. Wilson		23 Oct 2013	Commander, Air Force Global Strike Command (COMAFGSC), 2013–2015.; Deputy Commander, U.S. Strategic Command (DCDRUSSTRATCOM), 2015–2016.	3	1981 (Texas A&M)	32	(c. 1959– ) Promoted to general, 22 Jul 2016.
42	Samuel D. Cox		3 Dec 2013	Deputy Chief of Staff, Manpower, Personnel and Services, Air Staff (DCS A1), 2013–2015.; Commander, Eighteenth Air Force (Air Forces Transportation), 2015–2017.	4	1984 (USAFA)	29	(1961– )
*	John W. Raymond		31 Jan 2014	Commander, Fourteenth Air Force (Air Forces Strategic)/Commander, Joint Functional Component Command for Space (COMAFSTRAT/CDRJFCC Space), 2014–2015.; Deputy Chief of Staff, Operations, Air Staff (DCS A3), 2015–2016.	2	1984 (AFROTC)	30	(1962– ) (Note: Transferred to U.S. Space Force, 20 December 2019.) (Note: Served as Chief of Space Operations (CSO).) Promoted to general, 25 Oct 2016. Great-great-grandson of Army brigadier general Charles W. Raymond.
43	Wendy M. Masiello		8 May 2014	Director, Defense Contract Management Agency (DIRDCMA), 2014–2017.	3	1980 (AFROTC)	34	(1958– ) Wife of Air Force major general Thomas J. Masiello.
44	Christopher F. Burne		23 May 2014	Judge Advocate General, U.S. Air Force (AF/JA), 2014–2018.	4	1983 (direct)	31	(c. 1962– )
45	Darryl L. Roberson		30 May 2014	Commander, Third Air Force (Air Forces Europe)/Commander, Seventeenth Expeditionary Air Force, 2014–2015.; Commander, Air Education and Training Command (COMAETC), 2015–2017.	3	1983 (USAFA)	31	(1960– )
46	Thomas J. Trask		16 Jun 2014	Vice Commander, U.S. Special Operations Command (VCDRUSSOCOM), 2014–2017.	3	1984 (AFROTC)	30	(1961– )
47	Samuel A. Greaves		19 Jun 2014	Commander, Space and Missile Systems Center/Program Executive Officer, Space (COMSMC/PEO Space), 2014–2017.; Director, Missile Defense Agency (DIRMDA), 2017–2019.	5	1982 (AFROTC)	32	
*	Carlton D. Everhart II		20 Jun 2014	Commander, Eighteenth Air Force (Air Forces Transportation), 2014–2015.	1	1983 (Virginia Tech)	31	(1961– ) Promoted to general, 11 Aug 2015.
48	Anthony J. Rock		17 Jun 2014	Chief, Office of the Defense Representative, U.S. Embassy Pakistan, 2014–2016.; Inspector General, U.S. Air Force (AF/IG), 2016–2017.	3	1982 (OTS)	32	(1959– )
49	James K. McLaughlin		14 Aug 2014	Deputy Commander, U.S. Cyber Command (DCDRUSCYBERCOM), 2014–2017.	3	1983 (USAFA)	31	
50	Marshall B. Webb		28 Aug 2014	Commander, NATO Special Operations Headquarters (CDRNSHQ), 2014–2016.; Commander, Air Force Special Operations Command (COMAFSOC), 2016–2019.; Commander, Air Education and Training Command (COMAETC), 2019–2022.	8	1984 (USAFA)	30	(1961– )
51	William J. Bender		19 Sep 2014	Chief, Information Dominance/Chief Information Officer, Office of the Secretary of the Air Force (SAF/CIO A6), 2014–2017.	3	1983 (AFROTC)	31	
52	John F. Thompson		2 Oct 2014	Commander, Air Force Life Cycle Management Center (COMAFLCMC), 2014–2017.; Commander, Space and Missile Systems Center/Program Executive Officer, Space (COMSMC/PEO Space), 2017–2021.	7	1984 (USAFA)	30	
53	Steven L. Kwast		10 Nov 2014	Commander/President, Air University (COM/Pres. AU), 2014–2017.; Commander, Air Education and Training Command (COMAETC), 2017–2019.	5	1986 (USAFA)	28	
*	Terrence J. O'Shaughnessy		19 Dec 2014	Deputy Commander, United Nations Command/Deputy Commander, U.S. Forces Korea/Commander, Air Component Command, ROK/U.S. Combined Forces Command/Commander, Seventh Air Force (DCDRUNC/DCDRUSFK/AIRCDRCFC), 2014–2016.	2	1986 (USAFA)	28	(c. 1964– ) Promoted to general, 12 Jul 2016.
54	Mark C. Nowland		19 Dec 2014	Commander, Twelfth Air Force (Air Forces Southern), 2014–2016.; Deputy Chief of Staff, Operations, Air Staff (DCS A3), 2016–2018.	4	1985 (USAFA)	29	(1958– )
55	John B. Cooper		22 May 2015	Deputy Chief of Staff for Logistics, Installations and Mission Support, Air Staff (DCS A4/7), 2015–2018.	3	1983 (Citadel)	32	
56	John L. Dolan		5 Jun 2015	Commander, U.S. Forces Japan/Commander, Fifth Air Force (COMUSFJ), 2015–2016.; Director, Operations, Joint Staff, J3, 2016–2018.	3	1986 (AFROTC)	29	(c. 1964– )
57	Mark A. Ediger		5 Jun 2015	Surgeon General, U.S. Air Force (AF/SG), 2015–2018.	3	1986 (direct)	29	
58	Lee K. Levy II		5 Jun 2015	Commander, Air Force Sustainment Center (COMAFSC), 2015–2018.	3	1985 (AFROTC)	30	(c. 1964– ) (Note: On active duty as major general, 2018–2019; retired as major general, November 2019.)
59	Jeffrey G. Lofgren		19 Jun 2015	Deputy Chief of Staff for Capability Development, Headquarters Supreme Allied Commander Transformation (DCOFS-CD), 2015–2018.	3	1984 (USAFA)	31	
*	Arnold W. Bunch Jr.		24 Jun 2015	Military Deputy to the Assistant Secretary of the Air Force for Acquisition (MILDEP SAF/AQ), 2015–2018.; Military Deputy to the Assistant Secretary of the Air Force for Acquisition, Technology and Logistics (MILDEP SAF/AQ), 2018–2019.	4	1984 (USAFA)	31	(1962– ) Promoted to general, 31 May 2019.
*	Charles Q. Brown Jr.		29 Jun 2015	Commander, U.S. Air Forces Central Command/Combined Forces Air Component Commander, U.S. Central Command (COMUSAFCENT/CFACC), 2015–2016.; Deputy Commander, U.S. Central Command (DCDRUSCENTCOM), 2016–2018.	3	1985 (AFROTC)	30	(1962– ) (Note: Served as Chairman, Joint Chiefs of Staff (CJCS).) Promoted to general, 26 Jul 2018.
*	Timothy M. Ray		2 Jul 2015	Commander, Third Air Force (Air Forces Europe)/Commander, Seventeenth Expeditionary Air Force, 2015–2016.; Deputy Commander, U.S. European Command (DCDRUSEUCOM), 2016–2018.	3	1985 (USAFA)	30	(1963– ) Promoted to general, 21 Aug 2018.
60	John N.T. Shanahan		11 Aug 2015	Director for Defense Intelligence (Warfighter Support) (DDIWS), 2015–2017.; Director for Defense Intelligence (Warfighter Support)/Director, Algorithmic Warfare Cross-Functional Team (Project Maven) (DDIWS/DIRAWCFT), 2017–2018.; Director, Joint Artificial Intelligence Center (DIRJAIC), 2018–2020.	5	1984 (AFROTC)	31	(1962– )
61	David J. Buck		14 Aug 2015	Commander, Fourteenth Air Force (Air Forces Strategic)/Commander, Joint Functional Component Command for Space (COMAFSTRAT/CDRJFCC Space), 2015–2017.	2	1986 (OTS)	29	
62	Gina M. Grosso		15 Oct 2015	Deputy Chief of Staff, Manpower, Personnel and Services, Air Staff (DCS A1), 2015–2018.	3	1986 (AFROTC)	29	(1964– ) U.S. Assistant Secretary of Veterans Affairs for Human Resources and Administration/Operations, Security and Preparedness, 2021–2023.
63	Jack Weinstein		20 Nov 2015	Deputy Chief of Staff, Strategic Deterrence and Nuclear Integration, Air Staff (DCS A10), 2015–2018.	3	1982 (AFROTC)	33	
64	John D. Bansemer		7 Jan 2016	Assistant Director of National Intelligence, Partner Engagement, Office of the Director of National Intelligence (ADNI-PE), 2016–2019.	3	1987 (OTS)	29	
65	L. Scott Rice		4 May 2016	Director, Air National Guard (DIRANG), 2016–2020.	4	1980 (AFROTC)	36	(1958– )
66	R. Scott Williams		6 Jul 2016	Commander, First Air Force (Air Forces Northern)/Commander, Continental U.S. NORAD Region/Combined Force Air Component Commander, North American Aerospace Defense Command/Joint Force Air Component Commander, U.S. Northern Command (COMAFNORTH/CDRCONR/CFACCNORAD/JFACC USNORTHCOM), 2016–2019.	3	1984 (AFROTC)	32	
67	Thomas W. Bergeson		8 Jul 2016	Deputy Commander, United Nations Command/Deputy Commander, U.S. Forces Korea/Commander, Air Component Command, ROK/U.S. Combined Forces Command/Commander, Seventh Air Force (DCDRUNC/DCDRUSFK/AIRCDRCFC), 2016–2018.; Deputy Commander, U.S. Forces Korea/Commander, Air Component Command, United Nations Command/Commander, Air Component Command, ROK/U.S. Combined Forces Command/Commander, Seventh Air Force (DCDRUSFK/AIRCDRUNC/AIRCDRCFC), 2018.; Deputy Commander, U.S. Central Command (DCDRUSCENTCOM), 2018–2020.	4	1985 (USAFA)	31	(1962– )
*	Maryanne Miller		15 Jul 2016	Chief, Air Force Reserve/Commander, Air Force Reserve Command (CAFR/COMAFRC), 2016–2018.	2	1981 (AFROTC)	35	(1961– ) Promoted to general, 7 Sep 2018.
*	Jeffrey L. Harrigian		22 Jul 2016	Commander, U.S. Air Forces Central Command/Combined Forces Air Component Commander, U.S. Central Command (COMUSAFCENT/CFACC), 2016–2018.; Deputy Commander, U.S. Air Forces in Europe – Air Forces Africa (DCOMUSAFE-AFAFRICA), 2018–2019.	3	1985 (USAFA)	31	(1962– ) Promoted to general, 1 May 2019.
*	Kenneth S. Wilsbach		16 Aug 2016	Commander, Alaskan NORAD Region/Commander, Alaskan Command/Commander, Eleventh Air Force (CDRANR/CDRALCOM), 2016–2018.; Deputy Commander, U.S. Forces Korea/Commander, Air Component Command, United Nations Command/Commander, Air Component Command, ROK/U.S. Combined Forces Command/Commander, Seventh Air Force (DCDRUSFK/AIRCDRUNC/AIRCDRCFC), 2018–2020.	4	1985 (AFROTC)	31	(1963– ) Promoted to general, 8 Jul 2020.
68	Stayce D. Harris		19 Aug 2016	Assistant Vice Chief of Staff, U.S. Air Force/Director, Air Staff, U.S. Air Force (AVCSAF/AF/DS), 2016–2017.; Inspector General, U.S. Air Force (AF/IG), 2017–2019.	3	1982 (AFROTC)	34	(1959– ) First female African-American lieutenant general in the Air Force.
*	Mark D. Kelly		3 Oct 2016	Commander, Twelfth Air Force (Air Forces Southern), 2016–2018.; Deputy Chief of Staff, Operations, Air Staff (DCS A3), 2018–2020.	4	1986 (AFROTC)	30	(c. 1962– ) Promoted to general, 28 Aug 2020.
69	Jerry P. Martinez		6 Oct 2016	Commander, U.S. Forces Japan/Commander, Fifth Air Force (COMUSFJ), 2016–2019.; Commander, Pacific Air Forces (COMPACAF), 2018.	3	1986 (USAFA)	30	(c. 1964– )
70	Richard M. Clark		21 Oct 2016	Commander, Third Air Force (Air Forces Europe)/Commander, Seventeenth Expeditionary Air Force, 2016–2018.; Commander, Third Air Force (Air Forces Europe), 2018.; Deputy Chief of Staff, Strategic Deterrence and Nuclear Integration, Air Staff (DCS A10), 2018–2020.; Superintendent, U.S. Air Force Academy, 2020–2024.	8	1986 (USAFA)	30	(1964– ) First African-American superintendent of the U.S. Air Force Academy.
71	VeraLinn Jamieson		2 Nov 2016	Deputy Chief of Staff, Intelligence, Surveillance, and Reconnaissance, Air Staff (DCS A2), 2016–2019.; Deputy Chief of Staff, Intelligence, Surveillance, Reconnaissance, and Cyber Effects Operations, Air Staff (DCS A2/6), 2019.	3	1982 (AFROTC)	34	(1960– )
72	Steven M. Shepro		3 Nov 2016	Deputy Chairman, NATO Military Committee (DCMC), 2016–2019.	3	1984 (USAFA)	32	(c. 1962– )
73	Jerry D. Harris Jr.		22 Feb 2017	Deputy Chief of Staff, Strategic Plans, Programs, and Requirements, Air Staff (DCS A5/8), 2017–2018.; Deputy Chief of Staff, Plans and Programs, Air Staff (DCS A8), 2018–2019.	2	1985 (AFROTC)	32	
74	Robert D. McMurry Jr.		2 May 2017	Commander, Air Force Life Cycle Management Center (COMAFLCMC), 2017–2018.; Commander, Air Force Life Cycle Management Center/Program Executive Officer, Rapid Sustainment Office (COMAFLCMC/PEORSO), 2018–2020.; Commander, Air Force Materiel Command (COMAFMC), 2018–2019.	3	1985 (AFROTC)	32	
75	Giovanni K. Tuck		1 Jun 2017	Commander, Eighteenth Air Force (Air Forces Transportation), 2017–2018.; Director, Logistics, Joint Staff, J4, 2018–2020.	3	1987 (AFROTC)	30	
76	Bradford J. Shwedo		9 Jun 2017	Chief, Information Dominance/Chief Information Officer, Office of the Secretary of the Air Force (SAF/CIO A6), 2017–2018.; Director, Command, Control, Communications and Computers/Cyber and Chief Information Officer, Joint Staff, J6, 2018–2020.	3	1987 (USAFA)	30	(c. 1969– ) Director, Institute for Future Conflict, 2021–present.
77	James C. Vechery		2 Aug 2017	Deputy to the Commander for Military Operations, U.S. Africa Command, 2017–2020.	3	1988 (AFROTC)	29	(1966– )
78	Scott A. Howell		2 Aug 2017	Vice Commander, U.S. Special Operations Command (VCDRUSSOCOM), 2017–2018.; Commander, Joint Special Operations Command/Commander, Joint Special Operations Command Forward, U.S. Special Operations Command (CDRJSOC/CDRJSOC-F), 2018–2021.	4	1987 (USAFA)	30	(1965– )
79	Jay B. Silveria		11 Aug 2017	Superintendent, U.S. Air Force Academy, 2017–2020.	3	1985 (USAFA)	32	(1963– ) Executive Director, Bush School of Government and Public Service, 2020–present.
*	Jacqueline D. Van Ovost		8 Nov 2017	Director of Staff, U.S. Air Force (AF/DS), 2017–2020.; Deputy Commander, Air Mobility Command (DCOMAMC), 2020.	3	1988 (USAFA)	29	(1965– ) Promoted to general, 20 Aug 2020.
*	Anthony J. Cotton		15 Feb 2018	Commander/President, Air University (COM/Pres. AU), 2018–2019.; Deputy Commander, Air Force Global Strike Command/Deputy Commander, Air Forces Strategic-Air, U.S. Strategic Command (DCOMAFGSC/DCOMAFSTRATAIR), 2019–2021.	3	1986 (AFROTC)	32	(c. 1963– ) Promoted to general, 27 Aug 2021.
*	David D. Thompson		4 Apr 2018	Vice Commander, Air Force Space Command (VCOMAFSPC), 2018–2019.; Vice Commander, U.S. Space Force (VCOMUSSF), 2019–2020.	2	1985 (USAFA)	33	(1963– ) (Note: Transferred to U.S. Space Force, 30 Mar 2020.) (Note: Served as Vice Chief of Space Operations (VCSO).) Promoted to general, 1 Oct 2020.
80	Jeffrey A. Rockwell		18 May 2018	Judge Advocate General, U.S. Air Force (AF/JA), 2018–2019.; Judge Advocate General, U.S. Air Force and Space Force (AF & SF/JA), 2019–2022.	4	1987 (direct) (Note: Directly commissioned via the JAG Corps Direct Appointment Program.)	34	
81	Dorothy A. Hogg		4 Jun 2018	Surgeon General, U.S. Air Force (AF/SG), 2018–2019.; Surgeon General, U.S. Air Force and Space Force (AF & SF/SG), 2019–2021.	3	1983 (direct)	35	(1959– ) First woman to serve as Surgeon General of the United States Air Force.
*	James C. Slife		29 Jun 2018	Vice Commander, U.S. Special Operations Command (VCDRUSSOCOM), 2018–2019.; Commander, Air Force Special Operations Command (COMAFSOC), 2019–2022.; Deputy Chief of Staff, Operations, Air Staff (DCS A3), 2022–2023.	5	1989 (AFROTC)	29	(1967– ) Promoted to general, 19 Dec 2023.
82	Donald E. Kirkland		7 Aug 2018	Commander, Air Force Sustainment Center (COMAFSC), 2018–2021.	3	1988 (OTS)	30	
83	Warren D. Berry		17 Aug 2018	Deputy Chief of Staff for Logistics, Engineering and Force Protection, Air Staff (DCS A4), 2018–2022.	4	1987 (AFROTC)	31	
84	Christopher P. Weggeman		21 Aug 2018	Deputy Commander, Air Combat Command (DCOMACC), 2018–2021.	3	1987 (AFROTC)	31	(1965– )
*	Thomas A. Bussiere		24 Aug 2018	Commander, Alaskan NORAD Region/Commander, Alaskan Command/Commander, Eleventh Air Force (CDRANR/CDRALCOM), 2018–2020.; Deputy Commander, U.S. Strategic Command (DCDRUSSTRATCOM), 2020–2022.	4	1985 (Norwich)	33	(1963– ) Promoted to general, 7 Dec 2022.
85	Joseph T. Guastella Jr.		30 Aug 2018	Commander, U.S. Air Forces Central Command/Combined Forces Air Component Commander, U.S. Central Command (COMUSAFCENT/CFACC), 2018–2020.; Deputy Chief of Staff, Operations, Air Staff (DCS A3), 2020–2022.	4	1987 (USAFA)	31	(1965– )
86	Brian T. Kelly		4 Sep 2018	Deputy Chief of Staff, Manpower, Personnel and Services, Air Staff (DCS A1), 2018–2022.	4	1988 (AFROTC)	30	
87	Jon T. Thomas		4 Sep 2018	Deputy Commander, Air Mobility Command (DCOMAMC), 2018–2020.; Deputy Commander, Pacific Air Forces/Deputy Theater Air Component Commander to the Commander, U.S. Indo-Pacific Command (DCOMPACAF/DAIRCDRINDOPACOM), 2020–2021.	3	1989 (USAFA)	29	(1967– )
88	Richard W. Scobee		7 Sep 2018	Chief, Air Force Reserve/Commander, Air Force Reserve Command (CAFR/COMAFRC), 2018–2022.	4	1986 (USAFA)	32	(1964– ) Son of astronaut and Space Shuttle Challenger commander Francis R. Scobee.
89	Timothy G. Fay		1 Oct 2018	Deputy Chief of Staff, Strategy, Integration and Requirements, Air Staff (DCS A5), 2018–2020.; Director of Staff, U.S. Air Force (AF/DS), 2020–2021.	3	1987 (USAFA)	31	
90	Thomas J. Sharpy		12 Oct 2018	Deputy Chief of Staff for Capability Development, Headquarters Supreme Allied Commander Transformation (DCOFS-CD), 2018–2021.	3	1987 (USAFA)	31	
91	Michael T. Plehn		22 Oct 2018	Military Deputy Commander, U.S. Southern Command (MILDEPUSSOUTHCOM), 2018–2021.; President, National Defense University (NDU-P), 2021–2024.	6	1988 (USAFA)	30	(1965– )
*	David W. Allvin		31 Jan 2019	Director, Strategy, Plans and Policy, Joint Staff, J5/Senior Member, U.S. Delegation to the U.N. Military Staff Committee (Sr. Member MSC), 2019–2020.	1	1986 (USAFA)	33	(c. 1963– ) Promoted to general, 12 Nov 2020.
92	Sami D. Said		31 Jan 2019	Inspector General, U.S. Air Force (AF/IG), 2019–2021.; Inspector General, U.S. Department of the Air Force (DAF/IG), 2021–2022.	3	1991 (OTS)	28	(1964– )
*	Kevin B. Schneider		5 Feb 2019	Commander, U.S. Forces Japan/Commander, Fifth Air Force (COMUSFJ), 2019–2021.; Director of Staff, U.S. Air Force (AF/DS), 2021–2024.	5	1988 (USAFA)	31	Promoted to general, 9 Feb 2024.
93	Steven L. Basham		1 May 2019	Deputy Commander, U.S. Air Forces in Europe – Air Forces Africa (DCOMUSAFE-AFAFRICA), 2019–2022.; Deputy Commander, U.S. European Command (DCDRUSEUCOM), 2022–2024.	5	1989 (OTS)	30	(1965– )
94	Marc H. Sasseville		18 Jun 2019	Commander, First Air Force (Air Forces Northern)/Commander, Continental U.S. NORAD Region/Combined Force Air Component Commander, North American Aerospace Defense Command/Joint Force Air Component Commander, U.S. Northern Command (COMAFNORTH/CDRCONR/CFACCNORAD/JFACC USNORTHCOM), 2019–2020.; Vice Chief, National Guard Bureau (VCNGB), 2020–2024.	5	1985 (USAFA)	34	(1963– )
*	Duke Z. Richardson		20 Jun 2019	Military Deputy to the Assistant Secretary of the Air Force for Acquisition, Technology and Logistics (MILDEP SAF/AQ), 2019–2022.	3	1989 (OTS) (Note: Enlisted in 1983 as avionics technician, commissioned as second lieutenant in 1989.)	30	(c. 1964– ) Promoted to general, 13 Jun 2022.
95	Eric T. Fick		11 Jul 2019	Program Executive Officer, F-35 Lightning II Joint Program Office (PEO F-35), 2019–2022.	3	1990 (AFROTC)	29	
96	David S. Nahom		4 Sep 2019	Deputy Chief of Staff, Plans and Programs, Air Staff (DCS A8), 2019–2022.; Commander, Alaskan NORAD Region/Commander, Alaskan Command/Commander, Eleventh Air Force (CDRANR/CDRALCOM), 2022–2024.	5	1988 (AFROTC)	31	(1966– )
*	Glen D. VanHerck		27 Sep 2019	Director, Joint Staff (DJS), 2019–2020.	1	1987 (AFROTC)	32	(1962– ) Promoted to general, 20 Aug 2020.
*	Michael A. Minihan		27 Sep 2019	Deputy Commander, U.S. Indo-Pacific Command (DCDRUSINDOPACOM), 2019–2021.	2	1990 (AFROTC)	29	(1967– ) Promoted to general, 5 Oct 2021. Son of Air Force lieutenant general Kenneth Minihan.
97	Scott A. Kindsvater		27 Sep 2019	Deputy Chairman, NATO Military Committee (DCMC), 2019–2021.; Deputy Chair, NATO Military Committee (DCMC), 2021.	2	1989 (USAFA)	30	
*	Timothy D. Haugh		11 Oct 2019	Commander, Sixteenth Air Force (Air Forces Cyber)/Commander, Joint Force Headquarters – Cyber (Air Force) (COMAFCYBER/CDRJFHQ-C), 2019–2022.; Deputy Commander, U.S. Cyber Command (DCDRUSCYBERCOM), 2022–2024.	5	1991 (AFROTC)	28	(1969– ) Promoted to general, 2 Feb 2024.
99	Mary F. O'Brien		8 Nov 2019	Deputy Chief of Staff, Intelligence, Surveillance, Reconnaissance, and Cyber Effects Operations, Air Staff (DCS A2/6), 2019–2022.; Director, Command, Control, Communications and Computers/Cyber and Chief Information Officer, Joint Staff, J6, 2022–2023.	4	1989 (USAFA)	30	
*	James B. Hecker		22 Nov 2019	Commander/President, Air University (COM/Pres. AU), 2019–2022.	3	1989 (USAFA)	30	(c. 1969– ) Promoted to general, 27 Jun 2022.

== Background ==
=== Three-star positions, elevations and reductions ===
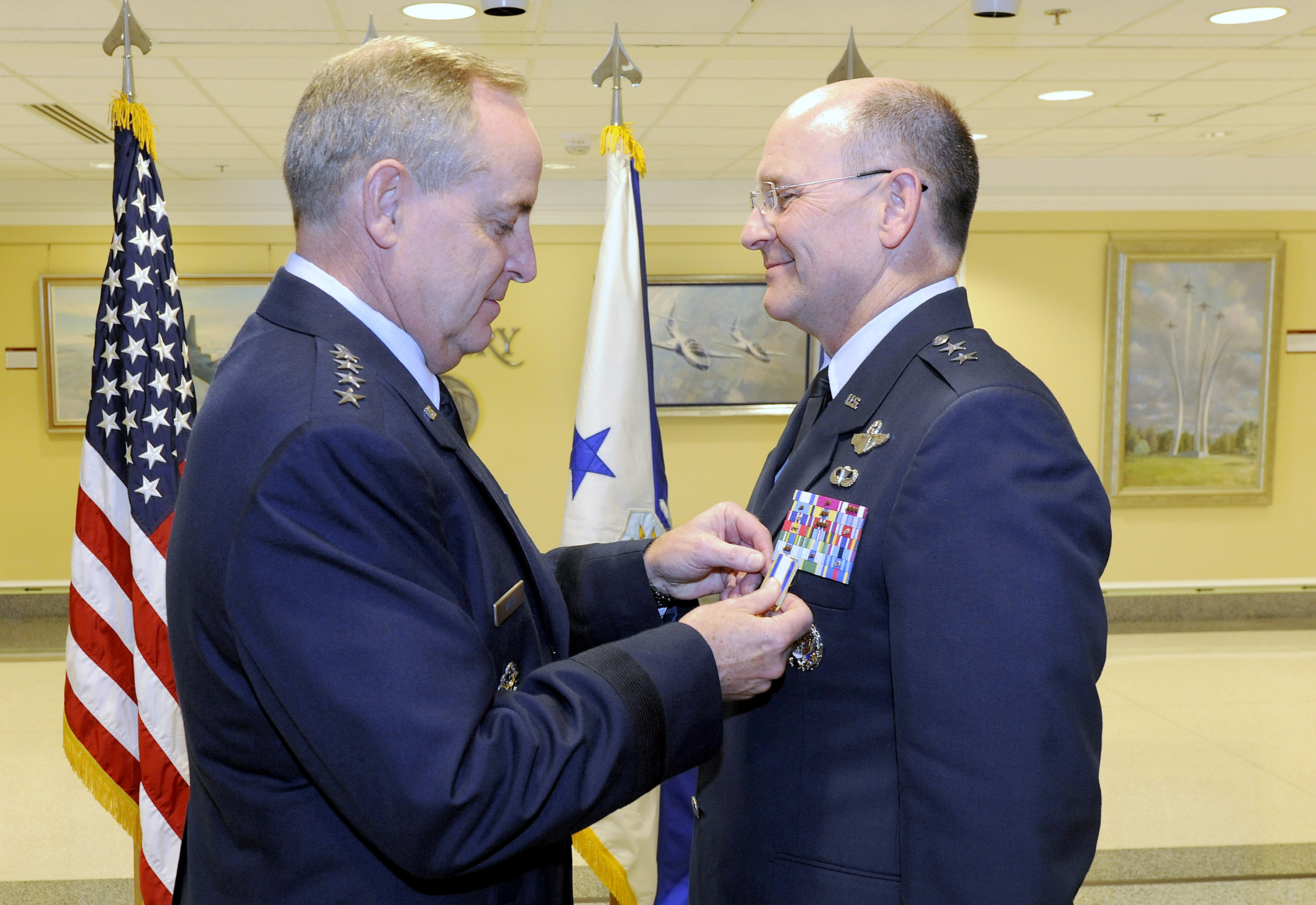
Lt Gen James "JJ" Jackson is awarded the Distinguished Service Medal by Gen Mark Welsh, chief of staff of the Air Force, at Jackson's promotion ceremony on 16 August 2012.

Several three-star positions were created, consolidated, or even eliminated entirely between 2010 and 2019.

- The rank of the vice chief of the National Guard Bureau was raised to lieutenant general in 2012 with the passage of the 2012 National Defense Authorization Act, achieving parity with the directors of the Army National Guard and Air National Guard. Major General Joseph L. Lengyel was subsequently promoted and assumed the role of vice chief on 18 August 2012. This was the fourth three-star billet allocated to the National Guard, the others being the aforementioned ARNG/ANG directors and the deputy commander of U.S. Northern Command. (Note: Per the 2008 National Defense Authorization Act, at least one deputy commander of USNORTHCOM must be a National Guard officer unless the commander is already such an officer.)
- The Air Force chief information officer became a civilian office in 2018, following similar restructuring by the Navy. Lieutenant General Bradford J. Shwedo was the last commissioned officer to hold the CIO position, ceding control to his deputy, William E. Marion II until his successor, under secretary of the Air Force Matthew P. Donovan assumed office. Shwedo's military responsibilities were transferred to the then-DCS A2, Lieutenant General VeraLinn Jamieson as the new DCS A2/6 in 2019.

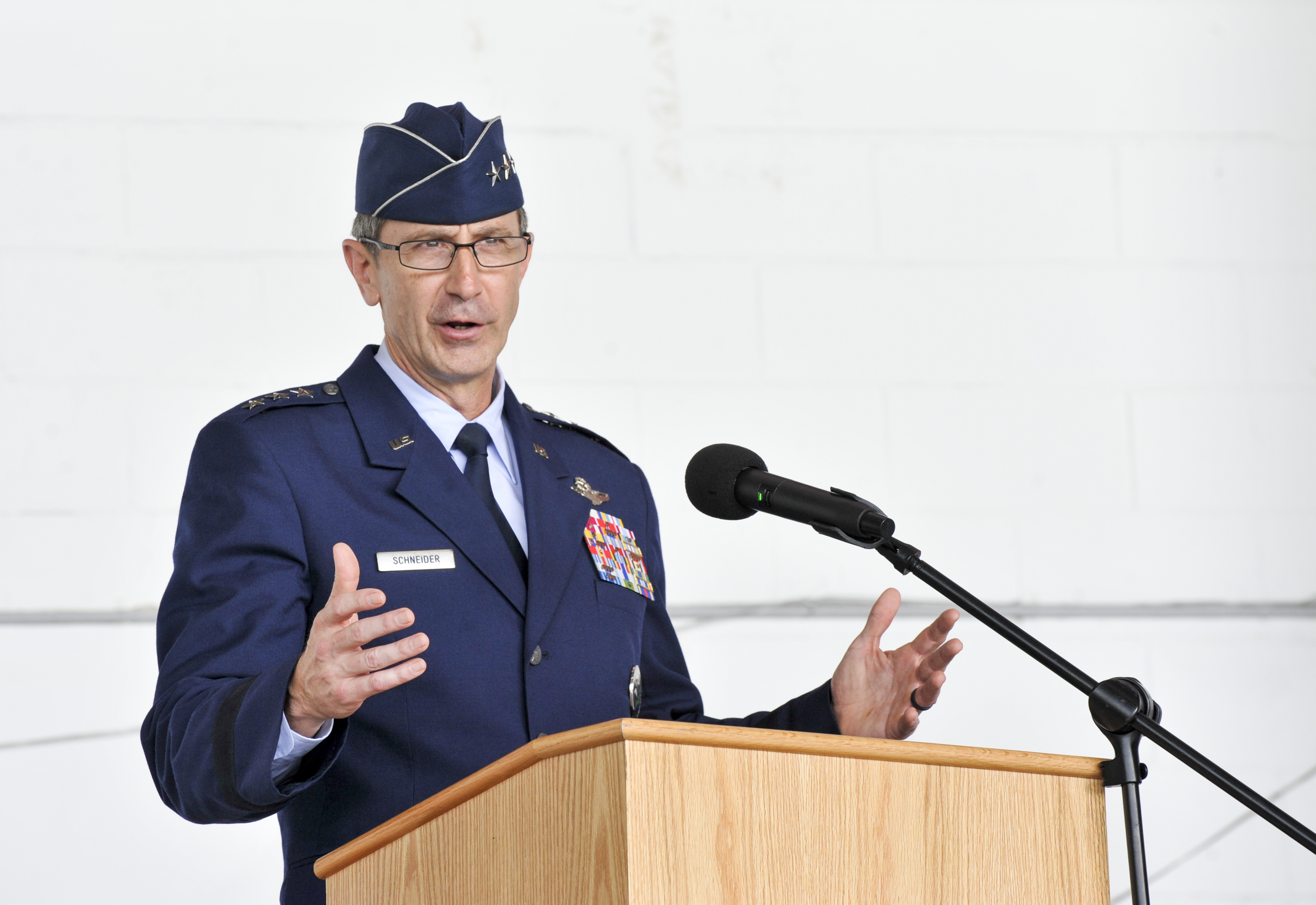
Lt Gen Kevin B. Schneider gives remarks at the 18th Wing change of command ceremony on 8 July 2019.

- Air Education and Training Command (AETC), which had been a four-star major command since 1975 (Note: as Air Training Command, before consolidating with Air University) was downgraded to three-star level to compensate for the elevation of the Air Force Global Strike Command (AFGSC) to a four-star command. (Note: Congressional approval would be required to bypass the authorized limit of nine four-star commands.) Accordingly, the office of the assistant chief of staff for strategic deterrence and nuclear integration was raised to deputy chief of staff level with the rank of lieutenant general. Lieutenant General Robin Rand was promoted to full general to assume command of AFGSC, with Third Air Force commander, Lieutenant General Darryl Roberson relieving Rand at AETC and Major General Jack Weinstein being promoted to lieutenant general as the first DCS A10.
- Air Force Life Cycle Management Center (AFLCMC), which was activated on 9 July 2012, absorbed the Aeronautical Systems Center and Electronic Systems Center; both were fully dissolved once AFLCMC achieved initial operational capability on 1 October 2012. Lieutenant General C. D. Moore II became the first commander of AFLCMC upon activation.

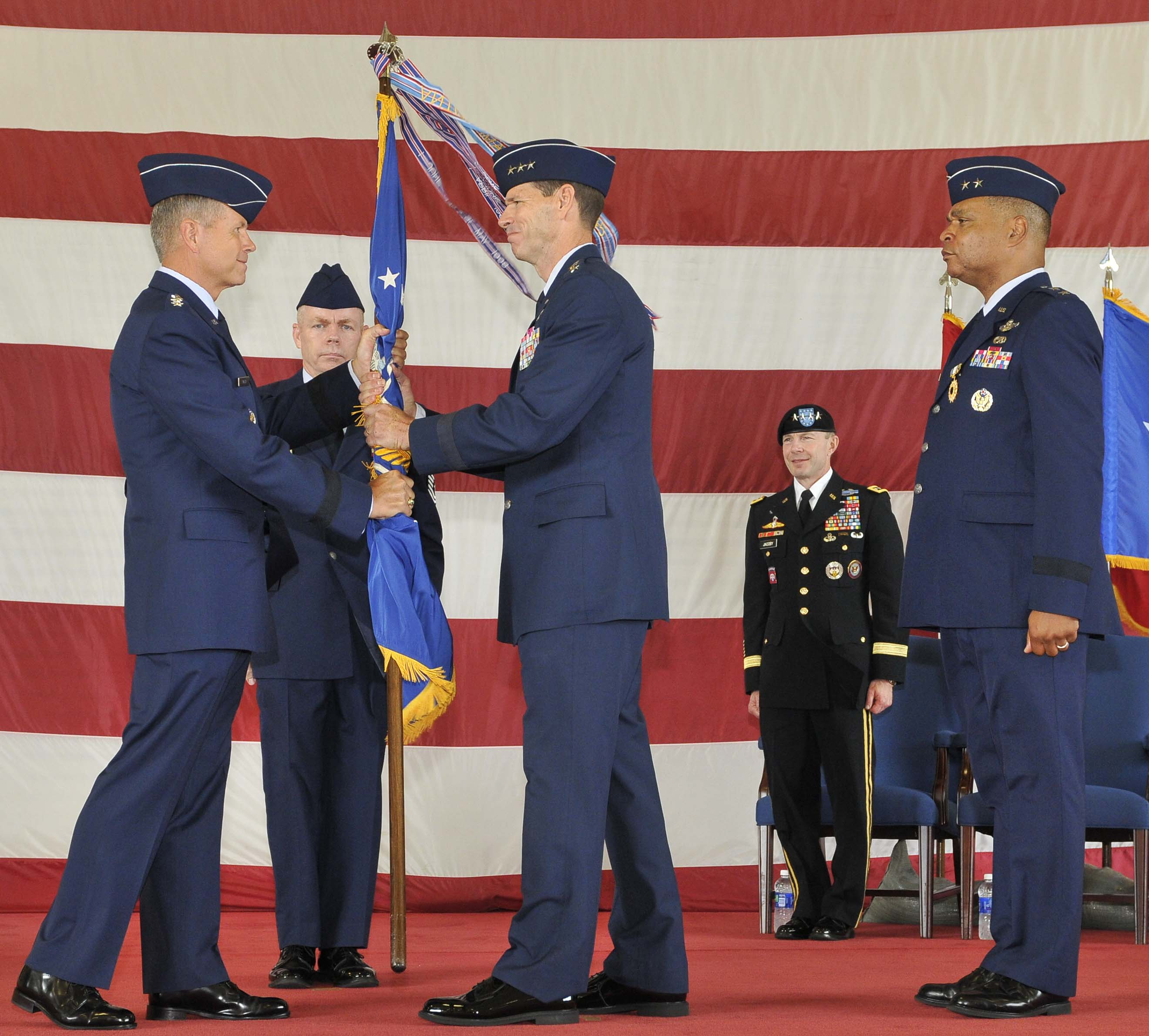
Lt Gen Stanley E. Clarke III (center) assumes command of First Air Force from Maj Gen Garry C. Dean (far right) on 31 August 2011.

- Five numbered air forces faced rank transitions between 2010 and 2019:
  - First Air Force (Air Forces Northern) became a three-star command in August 2011, with Lieutenant General Stanley E. Clarke III assuming command from Major General Garry C. Dean on 31 August 2011.
  - Twelfth Air Force (Air Forces Southern) became a two-star command in August 2018, with Major General Andrew A. Croft assuming command from Lieutenant General Mark D. Kelly on 3 August 2018.
  - Fourteenth Air Force, the NAF attached to the Air Force Space Command was redesignated as Space Operations Command from December 2019 to October 2020 with the establishment of the U.S. Space Force. When SpOC was made into a separate field command, the former was redesignated back to Fourteenth Air Force and deactivated. The NAF's last two commanders, Major Generals Stephen N. Whiting and John E. Shaw became lieutenant generals in the Space Force.
  - Sixteenth Air Force (Air Forces Cyber) in 2019 was reactivated as a three-star command from the merger of the Twenty-Fourth and Twenty-Fifth Air Forces, with Lieutenant General Timothy D. Haugh as its inaugural commander effective 11 October 2019.
  - Eighteenth Air Force (Air Forces Transportation) was reduced to a two-star command in July 2018, with Major General Sam C. Barrett assuming command from Lieutenant General Giovanni K. Tuck on 31 July 2018.

=== Senate confirmations ===
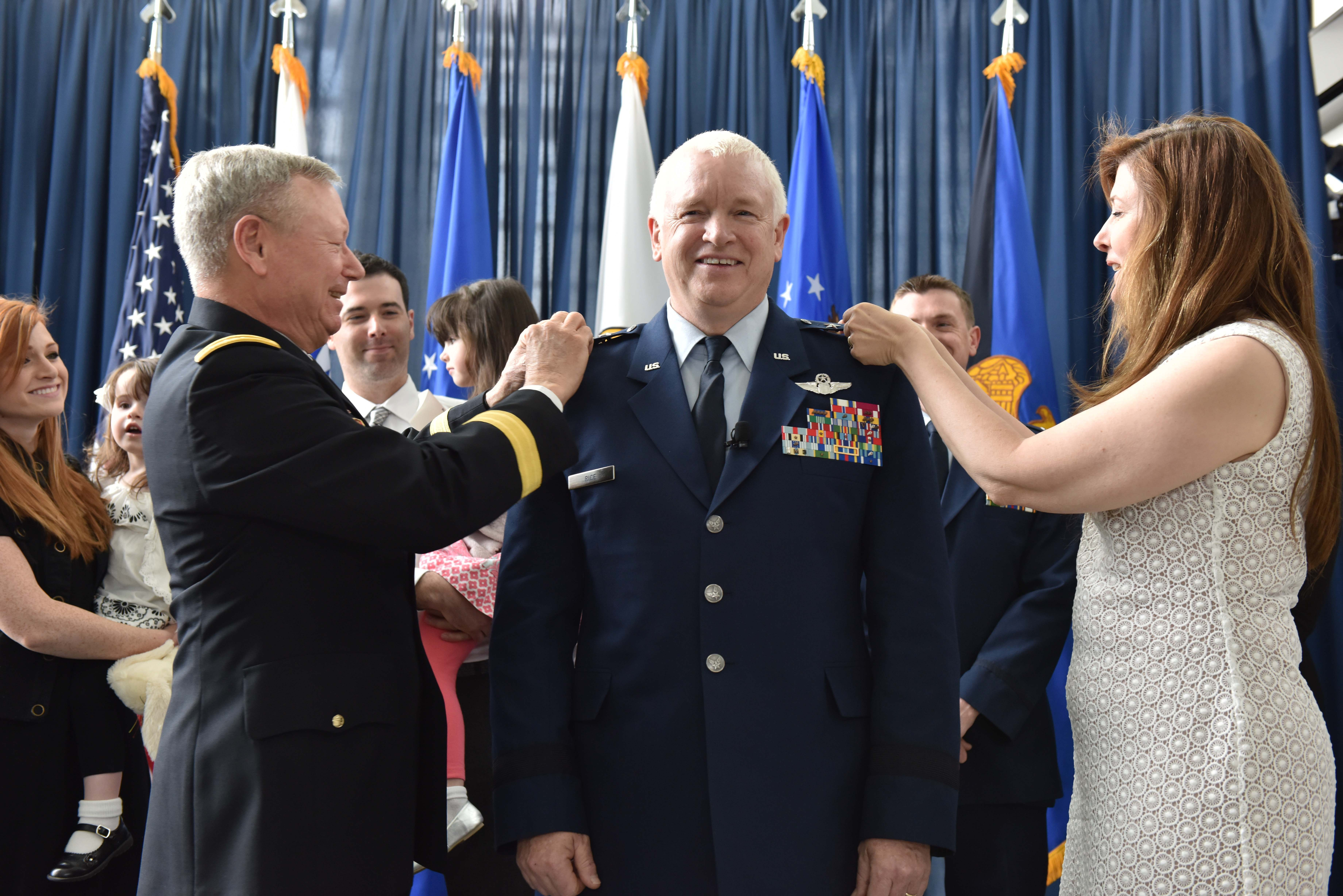
Lt Gen L. Scott Rice, incoming director of the Air National Guard, is pinned with his new rank on 10 May 2016.

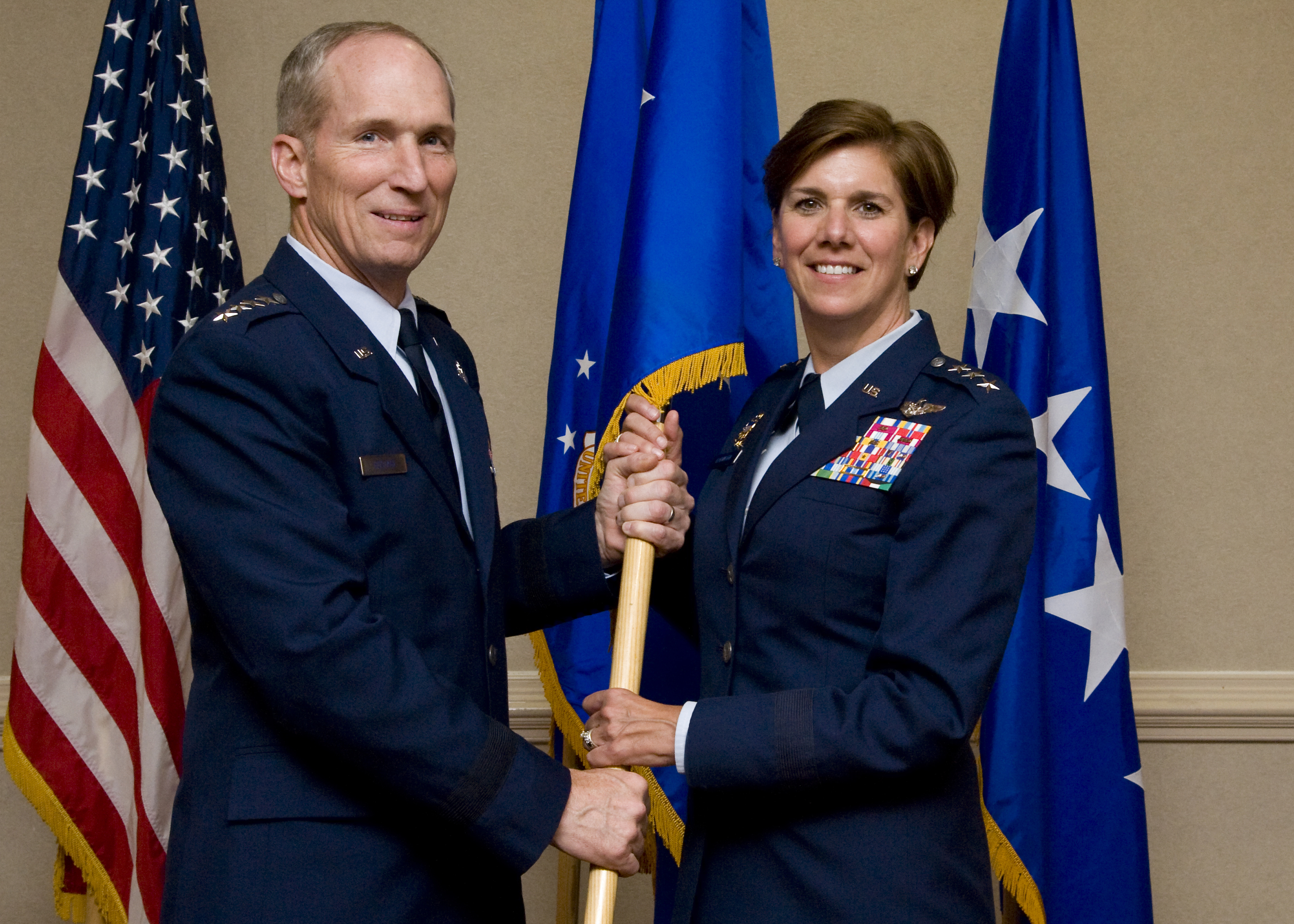
Lt Gen Lori J. Robinson is presented with her new three-star flag by Gen. Gilmary M. Hostage III on 17 May 2013.

Military nominations are considered by the Senate Armed Services Committee. While it is rare for three-star or four-star nominations to face even token opposition in the Senate, nominations that do face opposition due to controversy surrounding the nominee in question are typically withdrawn. Nominations that are not withdrawn are allowed to expire without action at the end of the legislative session.

- For example, the nomination of Lieutenant General Susan J. Helms for reappointment to rank to become vice commander of Air Force Space Command was withdrawn in November 2013, after an eight-month-long hold by Senator Claire McCaskill due to concerns about her overturning the ruling in a sexual assault case under her command. Helms subsequently submitted a request for retirement, effective 1 April 2014.
- The nomination of Major General Ryan F. Gonsalves for promotion to lieutenant general and assignment as commanding general of U.S. Army Europe was withdrawn in November 2017 after an investigation was launched into the general's inappropriate comment to a female Congressional staffer. As a result, Gonsalves was administratively reprimanded and retired in May 2018.

Additionally, events that take place after Senate confirmation may still delay or even prevent the nominee from assuming office.

- For example, Major General John G. Rossi, who had been confirmed for promotion to lieutenant general and assignment as the commanding general of the U.S. Army Space and Missile Defense Command in April 2016 died by suicide two days before his scheduled promotion and assumption of command. As a result, the then incumbent commander of USASMDC, Lieutenant General David L. Mann, remained in command beyond customary term limits until another nominee, Major General James H. Dickinson was confirmed by the Senate.

The 2020 National Defense Authorization Act explicitly prohibits adding new general officer billets to the Space Force beyond the sole four-star billet of the chief of space operations. This necessitated that five Air Force three-star appointments be transferred to the Space Force, leaving them with 30 as opposed to 35 available three-star positions.

- For example, the position of commander of the Space and Missile Systems Center (SMC) was transferred to the Space Force as the center transitioned into the Space Systems Command (SSC), the second Space Force field command to be established. The last Air Force general to command SMC, Lieutenant General John F. Thompson retired in August 2021 to make way for Lieutenant General Michael A. Guetlein, who assumed command of Space Systems Command on 13 August 2021.

== Legislative history ==
The following list of Congressional legislation includes all acts of Congress pertaining to appointments to the grade of lieutenant general in the United States Air Force from 2010 to 2019. (Note: Legislative history compiled from the U.S. Congress official website and U.S. Government Publishing Office official website.)

Each entry lists an act of Congress, its citation in the United States Statutes at Large or Public Law number, and a summary of the act's relevance, with officers affected by the act bracketed where applicable. Positions listed without reference to rank are assumed to be eligible for officers of three-star grade or higher.

List of legislation on appointments of lieutenant generals from 2010 to 2019
Legislation	Citation	Summary
Act of 7 January 2011 [Ike Skelton National Defense Authorization Act for Fiscal Year 2011]	124 Stat. 4137	Authorized officers frocked to grade of lieutenant general or general to wear the insignia of that grade for up to 14 days before assuming position for which that grade is authorized.; Repealed 30-day waiting period following congressional notification before officers below grade of lieutenant general or vice admiral may wear insignia of the next higher grade.
Act of 31 December 2011 [National Defense Authorization Act for Fiscal Year 2012]	125 Stat. 1298	Reestablished position of vice chief of the National Guard Bureau (Note: redesignated director of the Joint Staff of the National Guard Bureau by NDAA 2005) and assigned officeholder statutory grade of lieutenant general (Joseph L. Lengyel).; Excluded the chief and vice chief of the National Guard Bureau from general and flag officer distribution limits.
Act of 23 December 2016 [National Defense Authorization Act for Fiscal Year 2017]	130 Stat. 2000	Repealed authorization for the Chief of Staff to the President, if a general or flag officer of the United States Armed Forces, to be designated a position of importance and responsibility with grade of lieutenant general or vice admiral.; Removed statutory requirement for the director of the Department of Defense Test Resource Management Center, if a commissioned officer, to hold grade of lieutenant general or vice admiral.; Repealed statutory requirement for the director of the Missile Defense Agency, if a commissioned officer, to hold grade of lieutenant general or vice admiral.; Repealed statutory requirement for senior members of the United Nations Military Staff Committee to hold grade of lieutenant general or vice admiral.; Repealed statutory requirement for the directors of the Army National Guard and Air National Guard to hold grade of lieutenant general.; Repealed statutory requirement for the principal military deputy to the assistant secretary of the Air Force for acquisition to hold grade of lieutenant general.; Repealed statutory requirement for the judge advocate general of the Air Force to hold grade of lieutenant general.; Repealed statutory requirement for the chief of Air Force Reserve to hold grade of lieutenant general.
Act of 12 December 2019 [National Defense Authorization Act for Fiscal Year 2020]	133 Stat. 1346	Required advice and consent of the Senate on any proposal by the secretary of defense to increase the retired grade of any military officer through the reopening of the determination or certification of said officer's retired grade.

== See also ==
- Lieutenant general (United States)
- General officers in the United States
- List of active duty United States four-star officers
- List of active duty United States three-star officers
- List of United States Air Force four-star generals
- List of lieutenant generals in the United States Air Force before 1960
- List of United States Air Force lieutenant generals from 2000 to 2009
- List of United States Air Force lieutenant generals since 2020
- List of United States Space Force lieutenant generals
- List of United States military leaders by rank
