= General Norris =

General Norris may refer to:

- Frank Kingsley Norris (1893–1984), Australian Army major general
- Robert W. Norris (born 1932), U.S. Air Force major general
- Tracy R. Norris (fl. 1980s–2020s), Texas National Guard major general
- William C. Norris (general) (born 1926), U.S. Air Force major general
