= Jack L. Rives =

United States Air Force general

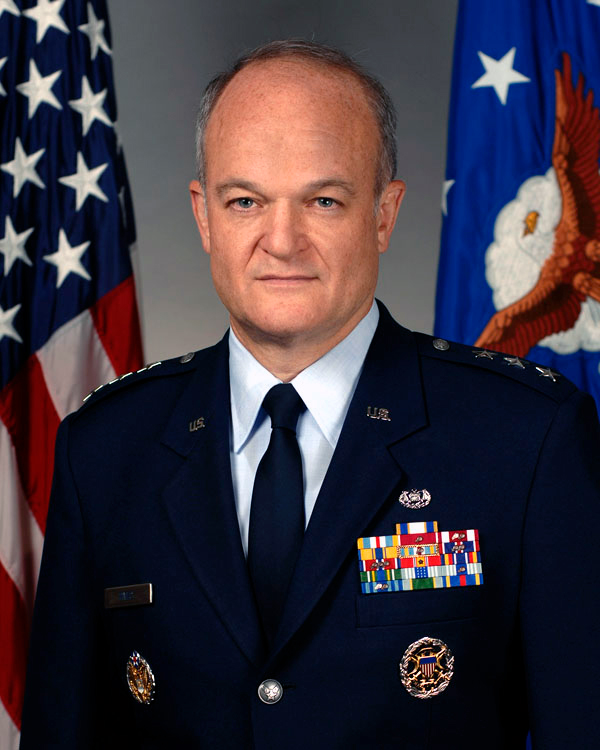
- Official portrait, 2008
- Nickname: Jack
- Born: 1952 (age 73–74)
- Allegiance: United States
- Branch: United States Air Force
- Service years: 1977–2010
- Rank: Lieutenant General
- Commands: Judge Advocate General's Corps, U.S. Air Force
- Awards: Air Force Distinguished Service Medal (2); Defense Superior Service Medal; Legion of Merit (2); Meritorious Service Medal (7); Air Force Commendation Medal
- Education: University of Georgia (AB, JD); Air Command and Staff College; USAF Air War College; National War College
- Other work: Executive Director, American Bar Association President, Rocket Legal Professional Services

Jack L. Rives (born 1952) is a former American military officer and executive director and chief operating officer of the American Bar Association. As of 2023, he serves as the President of Rocket Legal Professional Services, Inc., an independent law firm and wholly owned subsidiary of Rocket Lawyer, Inc. Rives is a former TJAG ("The Judge Advocate General") of the United States Air Force Judge Advocate General's Corps. In 2008, he became the first Judge Advocate General in any service to hold the 3-star rank of lieutenant general. He served in the U.S. Air Force from 1977 until 2010.

== Background ==
Jack Rives grew up in Rockmart, Georgia. He notes that his father was in the National Guard for a short time, but otherwise his family had no formal military "heritage."

Rives received an A.B. degree in political science from the University of Georgia in 1974 and a J.D. degree from the University of Georgia School of Law in 1976. He was a member of the Kappa Deuteron chapter of Phi Gamma Delta fraternity. He has also been educated at the Air Command and Staff College (1983), Air War College (1990), and National War College (1993; distinguished graduate).

== Air Force career ==
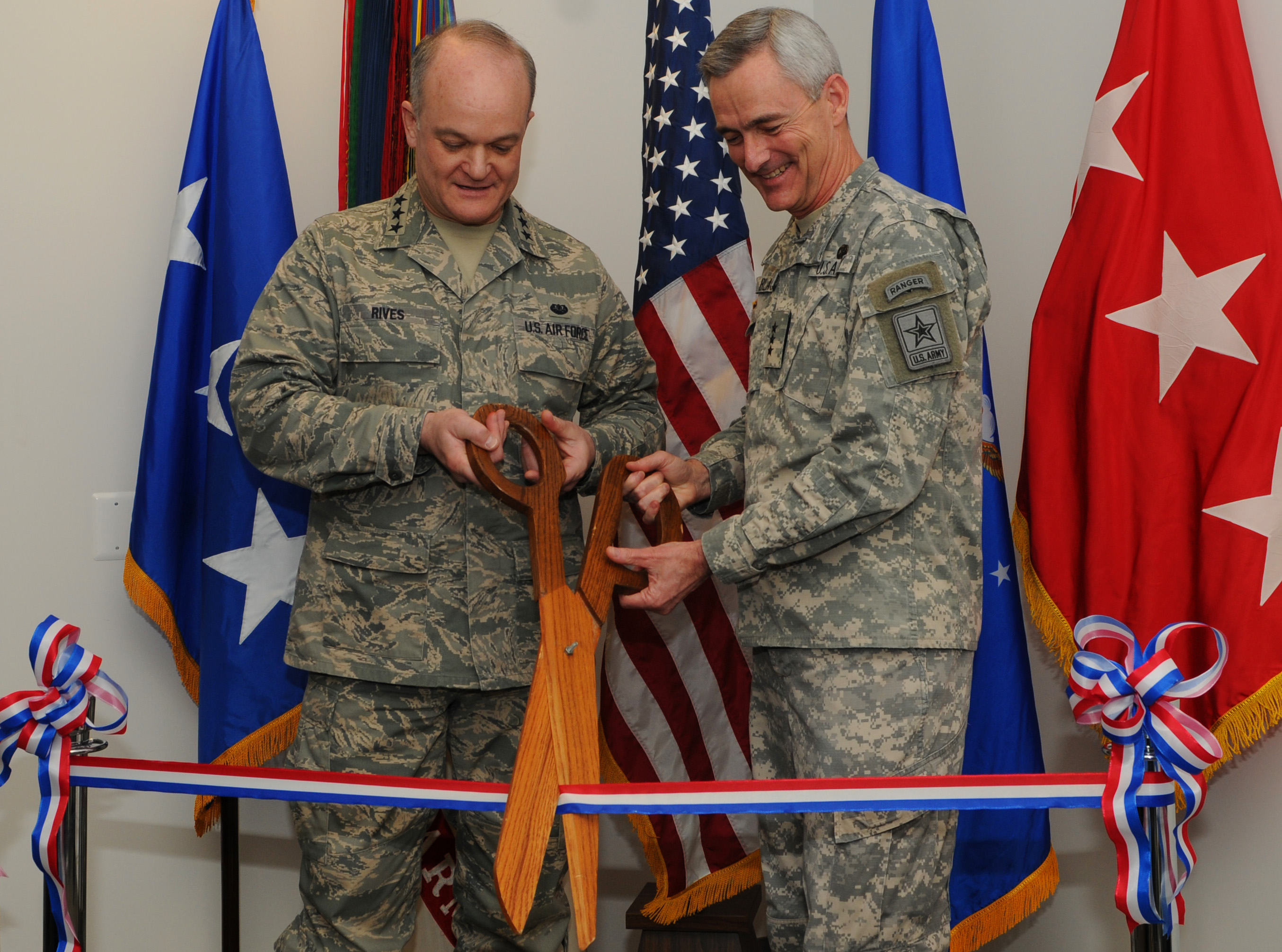
Lt. Gen. Jack L. Rives and Lt. Gen. Scott C. Black perform the ribbon cutting at the Pentagon Army Air Force Legal Assistance Office, 25 February 2009

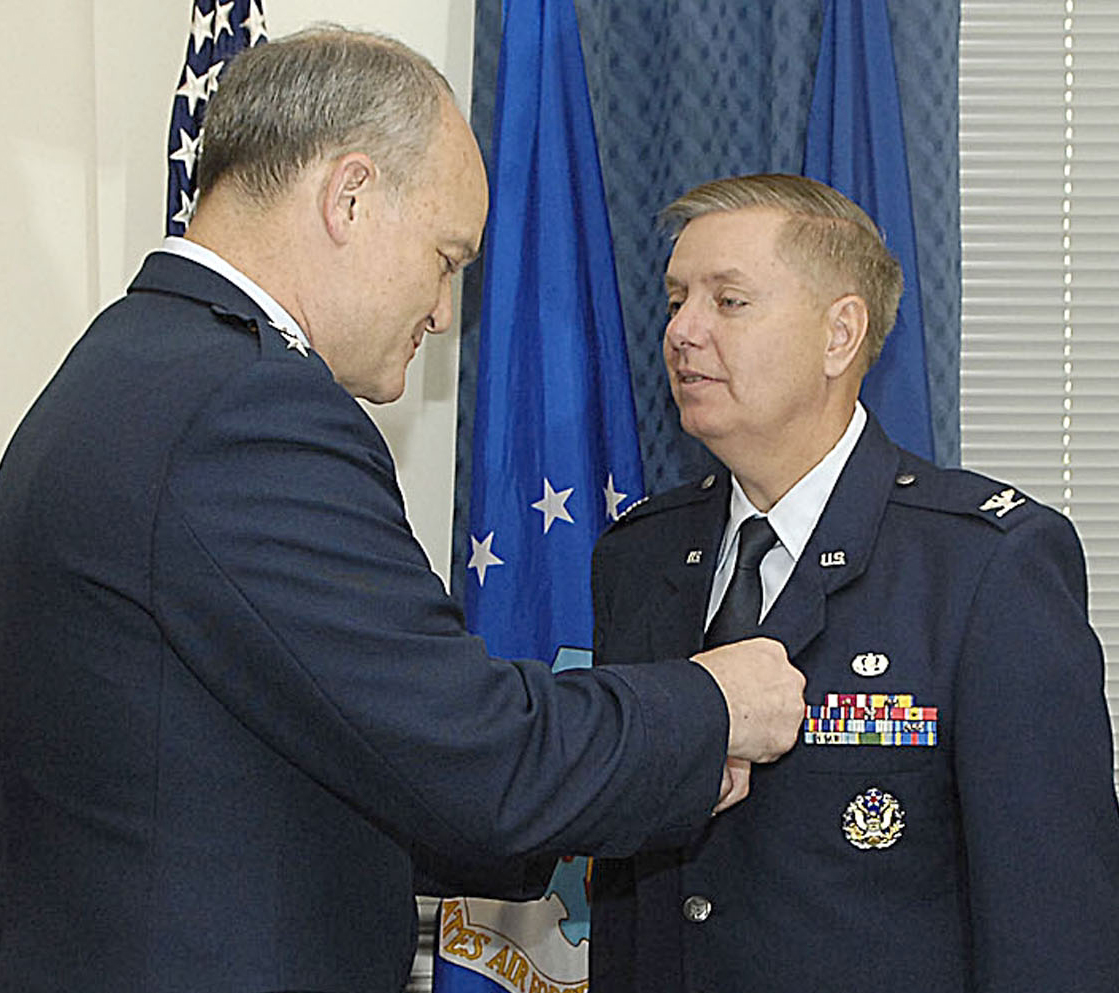
Lt. Gen. Rives pins the Meritorious Service Medal on Col. Lindsey Graham (United States Senator, South Carolina), 28 April 2009

Following graduation from law school, Rives began a 33-year career in the United States Air Force as a military attorney, or judge advocate (JAG). He served as The Judge Advocate General of the United States Air Force, the senior U.S. Air Force attorney, and he was the first military attorney to attain the three-star rank of lieutenant general. Rives led some 4,600 legal professionals, including 2,600 active duty, reserve component, and civilian lawyers across the U.S. and throughout the world.

Among his military awards and decorations are the Distinguished Service Medal with oak leaf cluster and the Defense Superior Service Medal.

Rives worked in the Professional Development Division in the Office of the Judge Advocate Generate between 1986 and 1990, was an appellate judge in the U.S. Air Force Court of Military Review between 1990 and 1992, and was the deputy legal counsel to the Chairman of the Joint Chiefs of Staff between 1993 and 1995. While in his assignment at JCS, he worked for Generals Colin Powell and John Shalikashvili.

Rives served as Commandant of the Air Force Judge Advocate General School from 1995 to 1998 before returning to Washington to lead the Air Force Executive Issues Team, where he built the team from the ground up and served as the Air Force’s chief crisis communicator. He was promoted to brigadier general and served as staff judge advocate at Air Combat Command, the primary provider of air combat forces, from 2000 to 2002.

Rives became Deputy Judge Advocate General (DJAG) and was promoted to major general in 2002. In September 2004, Maj. Gen. Thomas J. Fiscus was relieved of his duties as The Judge Advocate General (TJAG) in response to an investigation into his improper relationships with females, and Rives assumed responsibilities as the senior uniformed attorney in the Air Force. There was a period of over a year when the Air Force operated without an official TJAG, during which Rives continued to sign his name as DJAG, adding when necessary, "PDOT": "Performing the duties of TJAG".

In February 2003, Rives wrote a memo against enhanced interrogation techniques. He argued those procedures violated domestic and criminal law. He warned of adverse effects on U.S. service members, failure to comply with domestic and international law, and the U.S. Armed Forces' image and discipline. During a hearing on the Military Commissions Act in 2006, Rives and other senior military lawyers advised Congress to improve the processes for trials of detainees, such as granting defendants access to classified evidence and basic legal protections, than the rules proposed by the Bush administration.

In 2006, he was confirmed by the Senate as TJAG of the Air Force. In that position, he served as the legal adviser to the Chief of Staff and senior leadership of the Air Force, and he led and managed the worldwide JAG Corps. The 2008 National Defense Authorization Act promoted The Judge Advocate General of the Air Force to the rank of lieutenant general. Rives became the first judge advocate in any service to serve in the 3-star grade of lieutenant general.

=== JAG Corps 21 ===
Responding to fiscal restraints and an opportunity to dramatically reorganize and revise Air Force legal services, Rives presented a set of more than seven dozen reforms to the U.S. Air Force Chief of Staff, T. Michael Moseley. General Moseley approved the entire package of initiatives, known as “JAG Corps 21.” Rives’s work, which included the convening of a "Keystone Leadership Summit" in 2005 and subsequent years, and "Horizons sessions" to assess progress and course-correct as necessary, led to a new vision for the Judge Advocate General's Corps in the twenty-first century. Financial savings from JAG Corps 21 totaled in the tens of millions of dollars in the first five years alone.

As part of the new vision for the U.S. Air Force JAG Corps, Rives developed three guiding principles: Wisdom, Valor, and Justice.

== American Bar Association ==
On 22 April 2010, Rives was named the executive director and chief operating officer of the American Bar Association. He officially began to work in his new position on May 1, the day recognized as "Law Day" in the United States. He replaced Henry White Jr. who resigned in 2009 with other senior staff members following a reorganization set in motion by ABA president Carolyn Lamm.

During his tenure as the Executive Director (CEO equivalent) of the American Bar Association (2010-2023), Rives played a pivotal role in shaping the landscape of legal practice in the United States. He introduced a significant new membership model and led organizational transformation, revamping senior staff and adapting technological integration while reducing expenses and increasing effectiveness. Under his leadership, the ABA grew to 1,040 staff and $350 million in total assets. Rives also oversaw a $56 million increase in the ABA’s domestic and global grant awards.

Rives departed from the ABA in March 2023. He was succeeded by Alpha M. Brady as Executive Director, making her the first person of color to lead the ABA staff.

== Rocket Lawyer ==
In September 2023, Rives was appointed President of Rocket Legal Professional Services, Inc., an independent law firm and wholly owned subsidiary of Rocket Lawyer, Inc. In that position, he oversees Rocket Lawyer’s legal services initiatives and artificial intelligence strategy and solutions.

In September 2024, Rives led a campaign for Rocket Legal Professional Services, Inc., to secure approval from the Arizona Supreme Court for the subsidiary to operate as an Alternative Business Structure (ABS).

== Public speaking ==
Rives has spoken at the University of Georgia School of Law, his alma mater, where he discussed his experiences and perspectives on military and law. He spoke at Texas Tech University School of Law in 2021 and in 2022, he delivered the commencement speech at the University of North Georgia.

== Awards and decorations ==
Judge Advocate Badge
Office of the Joint Chiefs of Staff Identification Badge
Headquarters Air Force Badge

Air Force Distinguished Service Medal with one bronze oak leaf cluster
Defense Superior Service Medal
Legion of Merit with oak leaf cluster
Meritorious Service Medal with six oak leaf clusters
Air Force Commendation Medal
Air Force Outstanding Unit Award with two oak leaf clusters
Air Force Organizational Excellence Award with three oak leaf clusters
National Defense Service Medal with one bronze service star
Global War on Terrorism Service Medal
Korea Defense Service Medal
Air Force Overseas Short Tour Service Ribbon
Air Force Overseas Long Tour Service Ribbon with oak leaf cluster
Air Force Longevity Service Award with one silver and two bronze oak leaf clusters
Small Arms Expert Marksmanship Ribbon
Air Force Training Ribbon

Military offices
Preceded by Thomas J. Fiscus	Judge Advocate General of the United States Air Force; 2004 – 2010	Succeeded by Richard C. Harding
