= Harold R. Vague =

United States Air Force officer

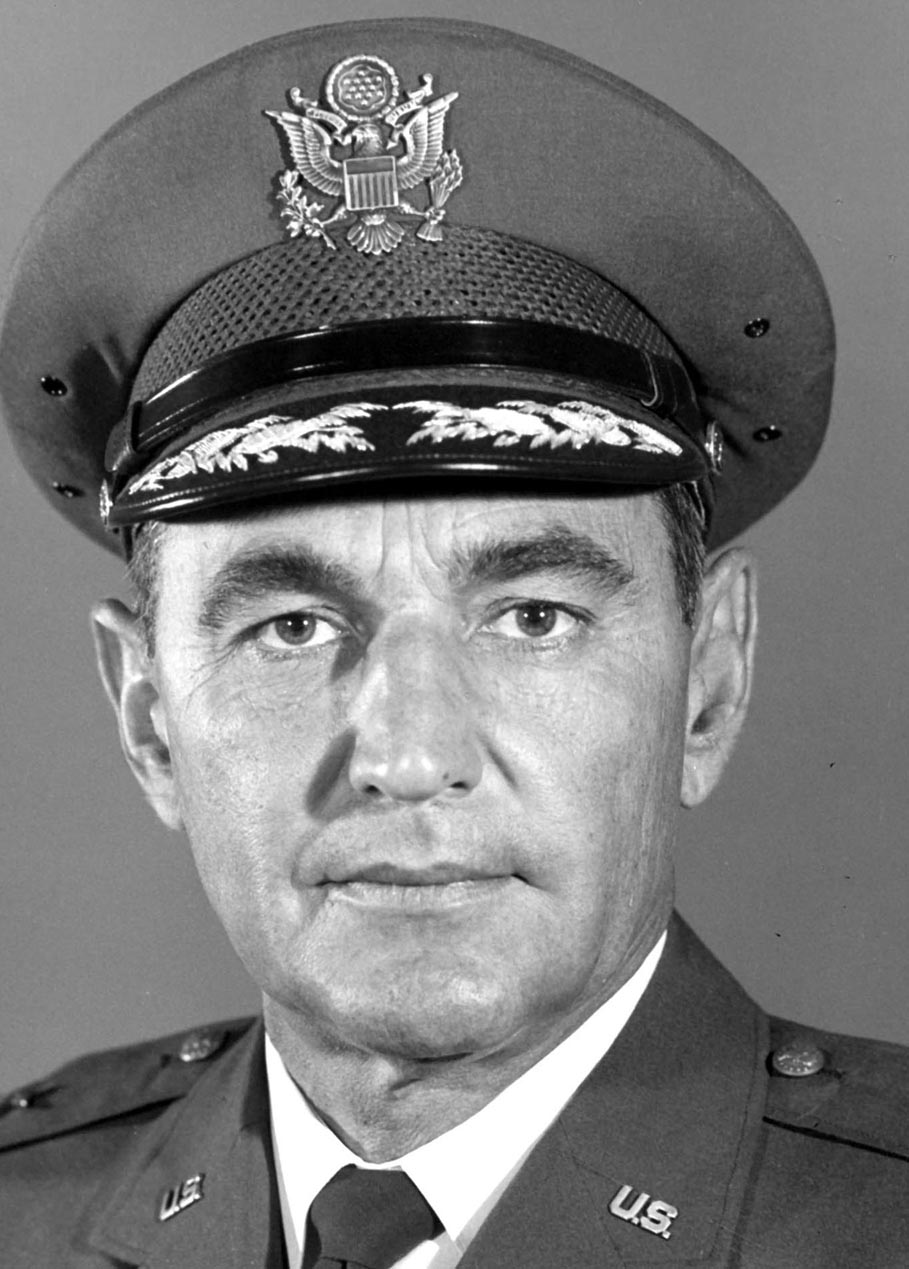
- Born: March 1, 1920; Ellsworth, Kansas
- Died: February 19, 2007 (aged 86); Riverside, California
- Military career
- Allegiance: United States of America
- Branch: United States Air Force
- Service years: 1942–1977
- Rank: Major General
- Commands: United States Air Force Judge Advocate General's Corps
- Awards: Legion of Merit with two oak leaf clusters, Distinguished Flying Cross, Air Medal with three oak leaf clusters and the Air Force Commendation Medal with oak leaf cluster

Harold Raymond Vague (March 1, 1920 – February 19, 2007) was an American Air Force major general who was the Judge Advocate General of the United States Air Force from 1973 to 1977.

== Biography ==
Vague was born in 1920, in Ellsworth, Kansas, where he attended local schools. He graduated from the University of Colorado in 1942 with a bachelor of arts degree in history. In March 1942, during his first year of law school, he entered active military service as an enlisted man and after completing basic training entered aviation cadet training. He received his navigator wings and commission as second lieutenant in June 1943.

During World War II, he served as a B-17 aircraft crewmember in England and flew 25 combat missions in the European Theater of Operations. He later served in staff and flying positions in England and France. He returned to the United States in June 1946 after 34 months of overseas service.

He then served in various positions until July 1947, when he returned to law school at the University of Colorado. After graduation in 1949 with a bachelor of laws degree, he attended the U.S. Air Force Navigator/Bombardier School at Mather Air Force Base, California In March 1950 he went to Biggs Air Force Base, Texas, as navigator/bombardier in B-50 aircraft with the 341st Bombardment Squadron and later served as assistant legal officer for the 97th Bombardment Wing. During 1951 he attended the Air Command and Staff School at Maxwell Air Force Base, Ala.

Vague was assigned to Eighth Air Force, Strategic Air Command, at Fort Worth, Texas, in March 1951 where he served as assistant chief and later chief, Military Justice Division, Office of the Staff Judge Advocate.

In April 1955 he was assigned to the United States Air Force Academy, Colorado Springs, Colorado, as a legal staff officer. In 1956 he became a member of the faculty of the academy and was appointed associate professor of law. He remained at the academy until July 1959 serving as both associate professor of law and assistant staff judge advocate. While at the academy, he attended the University of Denver in 1958 for graduate study in political science.

In July 1959 Vague was assigned as staff judge advocate for 3d Air Division, SAC, at Andersen Air Force Base, Guam. In August 1961 he was assigned to Headquarters U.S. Air Force as chief of the Legislative Division in the Office of the Judge Advocate General. He became the staff judge advocate for Fifteenth Air Force, Strategic Air Command, at March Air Force Base, California, in June 1965. He was assigned in April 1969 as staff judge advocate for Headquarters Pacific Air Forces, Hickam Air Force Base, Hawaii.

Vague returned to Headquarters, United States Air Force in August 1971 to assume duties as assistant judge advocate general. The president appointed him the judge advocate general, effective October 1, 1973, a post which carries with it a permanent grade of major general. He was promoted to the grade of major general effective October 1, 1973, with date of rank February 1, 1971. During his time as JAG, he oversaw the creation of the Area Defense Counsel and integration of technology and upgrade in training for legal research.

Vague is a member of the bar of the State of Colorado and is admitted to practice before the Supreme Court of the United States, Supreme Court of the State of Colorado, Court of Military Appeals, and the Federal District Court for the District of Colorado. He is a member of the Federal Bar Association, American Bar Association and the Judge Advocates Association.

His military decorations and awards include the Legion of Merit with two oak leaf clusters, Distinguished Flying Cross, Air Medal with three oak leaf clusters and the Air Force Commendation Medal with oak leaf cluster. He holds the aeronautical rating of navigator.

Following his retirement on October 1, 1977, Vague opened a private practice in Denver, Colorado, practicing for 15 years in civil and criminal law. He moved to Riverside, California and lived in Air Force Village West in 1993 until his death in 2007.
