= Walter D. Reed =

United States Air Force general (1924–2022)

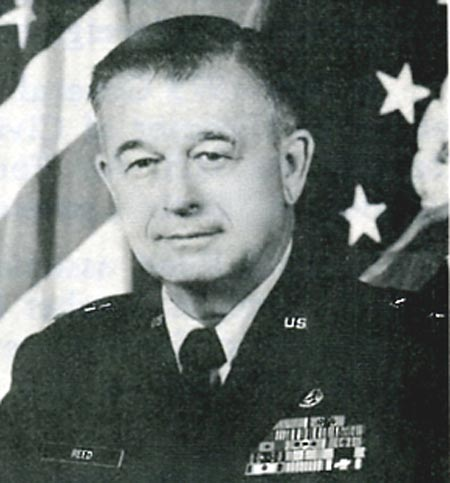
- Born: June 1, 1924; Dallas Center, Iowa, U.S.
- Died: July 28, 2022 (aged 98); Vermillion, South Dakota, U.S.
- Military career
- Allegiance: United States
- Branch: United States Air Force
- Service years: 1943–1980
- Rank: Major general
- Commands: United States Air Force Judge Advocate General's Corps

Walter Dudley Reed (June 1, 1924 – July 28, 2022) was a major general in the United States Air Force. He was the United States Air Force Judge Advocate General from 1977 to 1980. He held law degrees from the Drake University Law School as well as McGill University, and also attended The Hague Academy of International Law in the Netherlands. Reed died on July 28, 2022, at the age of 98.
