= Richard C. Harding =

American Air Force Lieutenant General

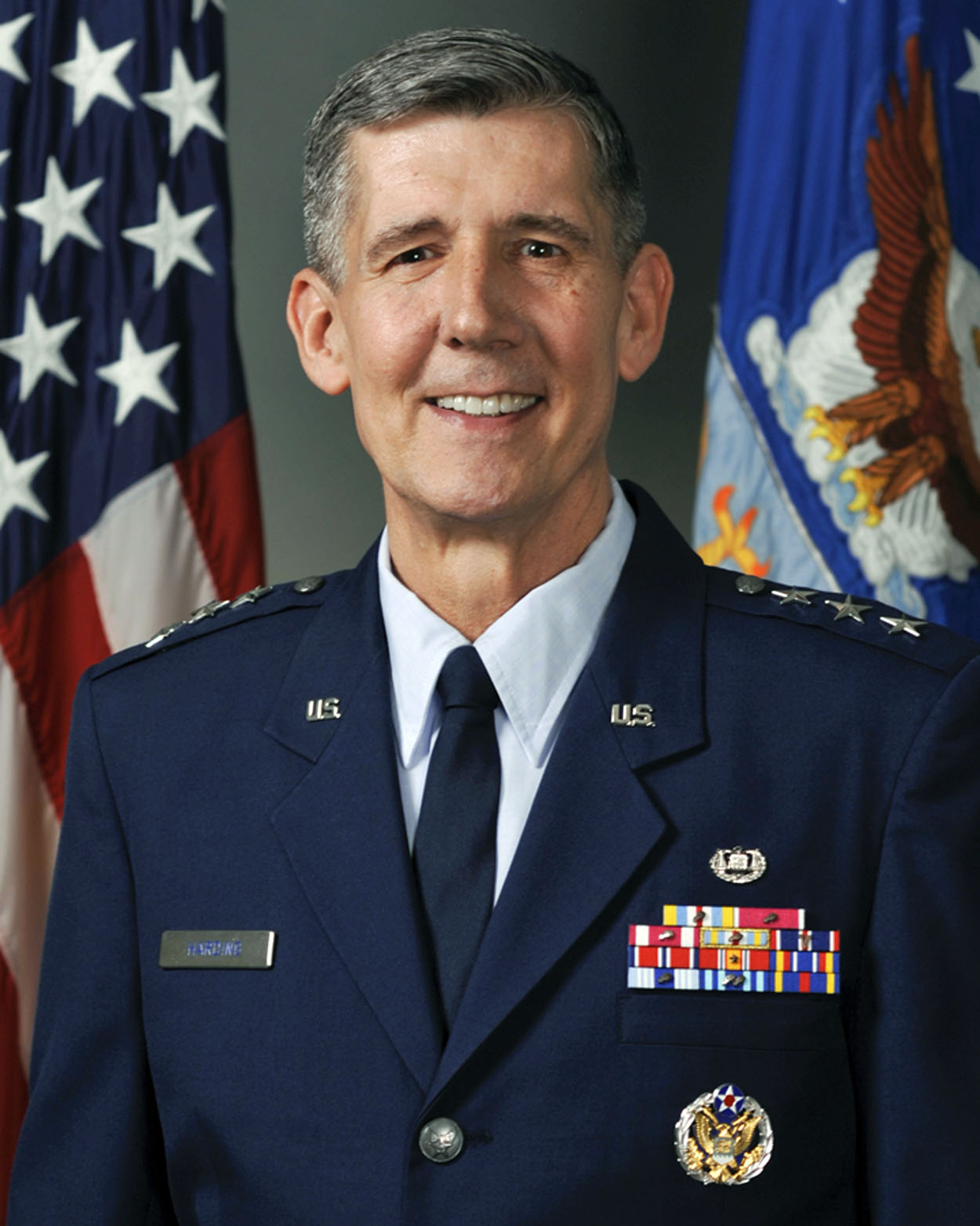
- Official portrait, 2013
- Military career
- Allegiance: United States
- Branch: United States Air Force
- Service years: 1980–2014
- Rank: Lieutenant General
- Commands: United States Air Force Judge Advocate General's Corps; Air Force Legal Operations Agency
- Awards: Air Force Distinguished Service Medal (2); Defense Superior Service Medal (2); Legion of Merit (2)

Richard C. Harding is an American retired lieutenant general who served as the Judge Advocate General of the United States Air Force. By federal statute, he served as the legal adviser to the Secretary of the Air Force, the Air Force Chief of Staff, and all officers subordinate to them.

== Biography ==
Harding (left), the judge advocate general, speaks to commanders and first sergeants at a leadership luncheon in March 2013 during a visit to Kadena Air Base, Japan

In 2010, Harding was promoted to lieutenant general (skipping the rank of major general) and became the Judge Advocate General of the United States Air Force.

Military offices
Preceded by Jack L. Rives	Judge Advocate General of the United States Air Force; 2010–2014	Succeeded by Christopher F. Burne
