= Reginald C. Harmon =

United States Air Force general

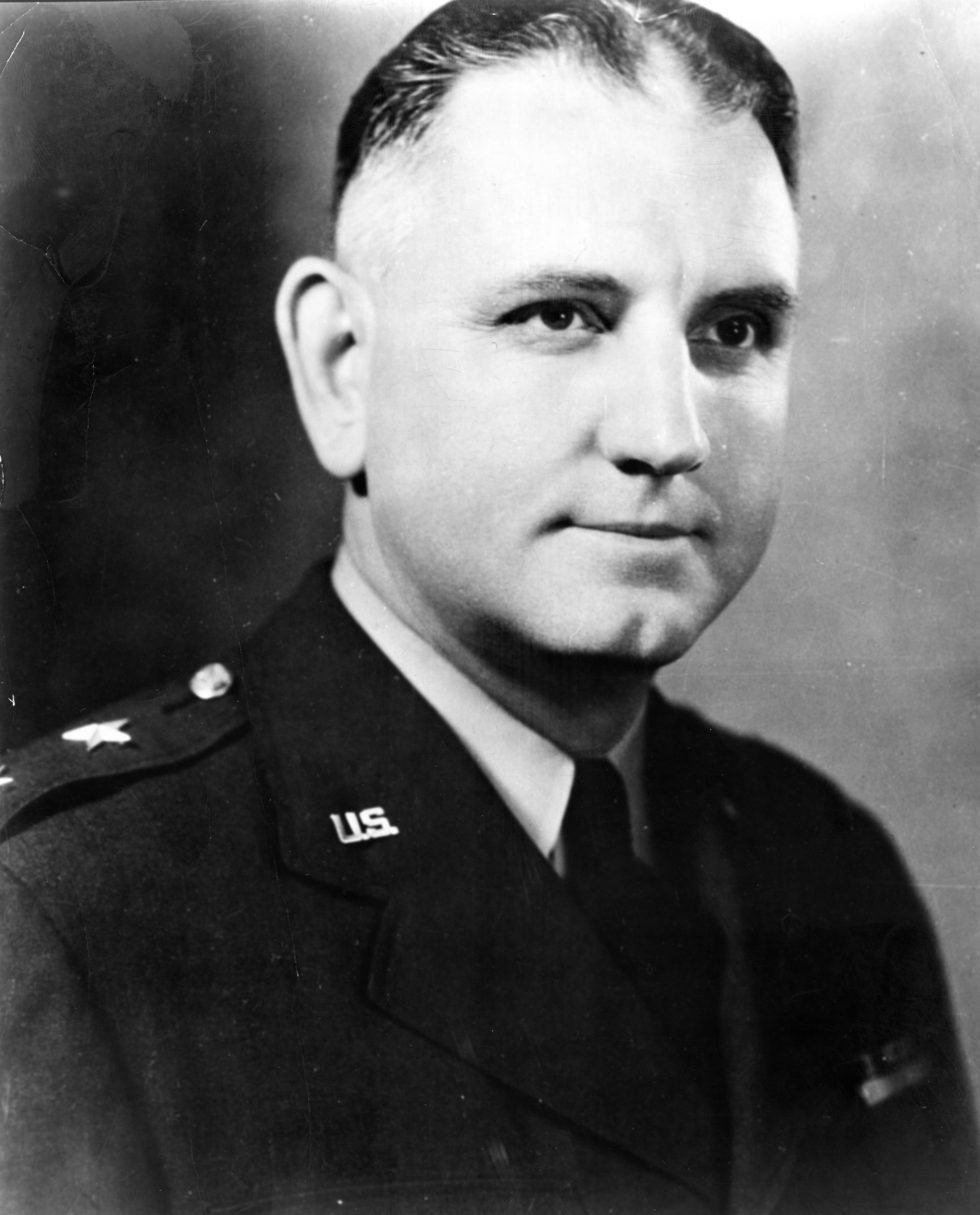
- Born: February 5, 1900; Olney, Illinois
- Died: October 23, 1992 (aged 92)
- Military career
- Allegiance: United States
- Branch: United States Air Force, United States Army
- Service years: 1940–1960
- Rank: Major General
- Awards: Legion of Merit; Distinguished Service Medal

Reginald C. Harmon (February 5, 1900 – October 23, 1992) was a Major General in the United States Air Force and served as its first Judge Advocate General. At the age of 29, he was elected as the mayor of Urbana, Illinois.

== Background ==
Reginald C. Harmon was born on February 5, 1900, near Olney, Illinois. After graduating from high school, he worked as a teacher in a rural school. He studied law at the University of Illinois College of Law receiving his Bachelor of Laws degree in 1927. During his time at the University of Illinois, Maj Gen Harmon joined the Phi Delta Phi legal fraternity. Maj Gen Harmon's military career also began during his undergraduate years at the university's Reserve Officers' Training Corps (ROTC).

At the age of 29, Maj Gen Harmon was elected as mayor of Urbana, Illinois. He held the office from 1929 to 1933. As mayor during the onset of the Great Depression, Maj Gen Harmon declared the nation's first business moratorium to prevent a run on the banks.

== Military career ==
After completing the ROTC program at the University of Illinois, Reginald Harmon was commissioned as a second lieutenant in the Field Artillery Reserve. In October 1940, Mr. Harmon was called to active duty at Wright Field, Dayton, Ohio, as a major in the Officers' Reserve Corp of the Army. Mr. Harmon represented the U.S. Government in an industrial expansion program to meet the growing needs of the Army Air Corps during World War II from 1940 to 1945. For his work in opening new supply sources for the production of aircraft, Mr. Harmon received the Legion of Merit. Between 1945 and 1948, he served as the Judge Advocate of the Air Material Command where he provided legal representation for the Air Force in a billion dollar procurement program. During this period, Mr. Harmon left the Reserve Corp for the regular component of the military. On September 8, 1948, Mr. Harmon became the first Judge Advocate General of the United States Air Force and was promoted to the rank of Major General. He was reappointed as the Judge Advocate General in 1952 and 1956.
