= Jeffrey A. Rockwell =

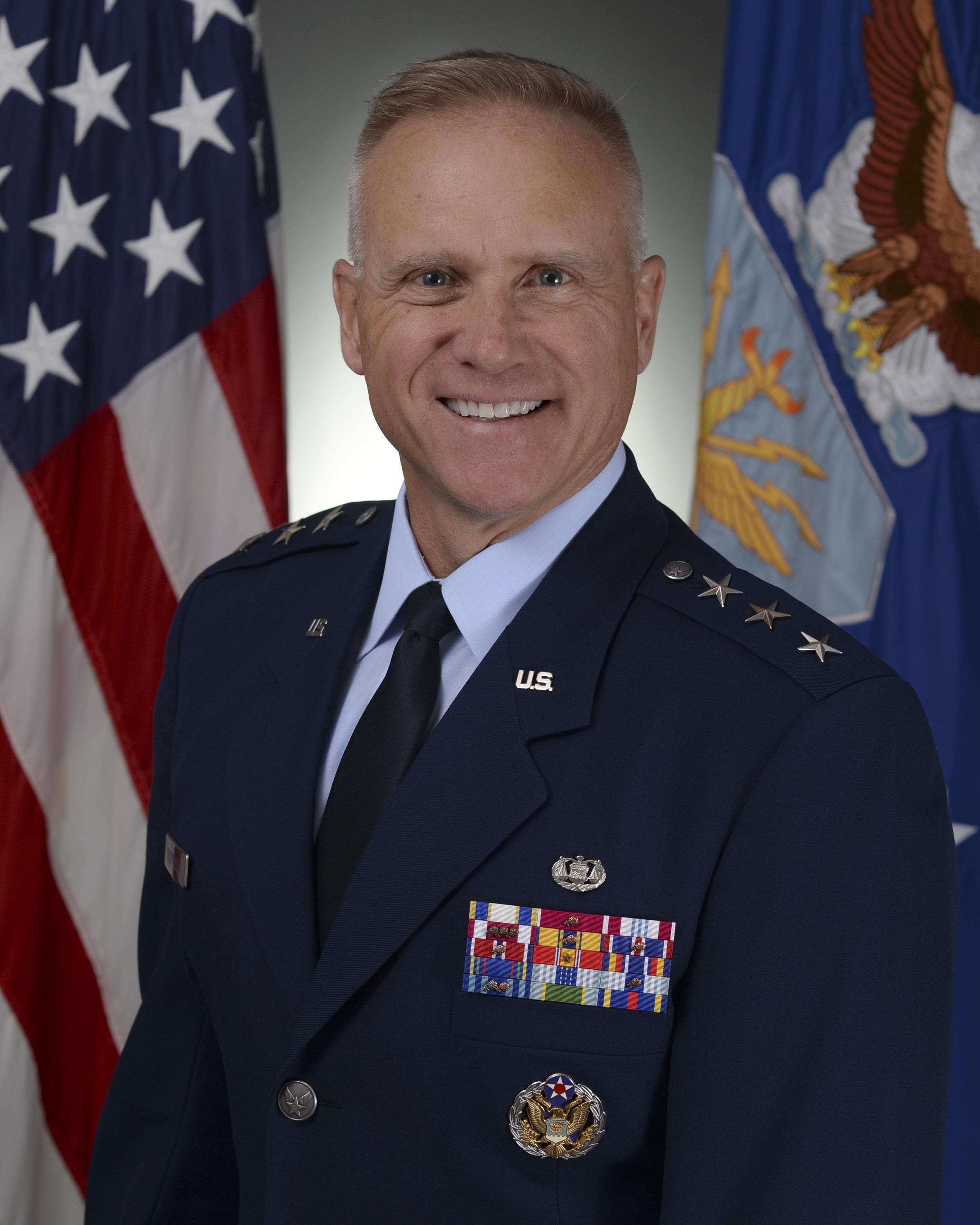
- Official portrait, 2019
- Military career
- Allegiance: United States
- Branch: United States Air Force
- Service years: 1987–2022
- Rank: Lieutenant General
- Commands: United States Air Force Judge Advocate General's Corps
- Awards: Air Force Distinguished Service Medal; Legion of Merit (2)

Jeffrey Alan Rockwell is a retired lieutenant general in the United States Air Force. He served as the United States Air Force Judge Advocate General from May 2018 to May 2022.

== Effective dates of promotions ==
Rank	Date
First Lieutenant	June 29, 1987
Captain	December 29, 1987
Major	April 1, 1995
Lieutenant Colonel	August 1, 2000
Colonel	April 1, 2005
Major General	May 22, 2014
Lieutenant General	May 18, 2018

== Awards and decorations ==
Judge Advocate Badge
Headquarters Air Force Badge

Air Force Distinguished Service Medal
Legion of Merit with one bronze oak leaf cluster
Defense Meritorious Service Medal
Meritorious Service Medal with three oak leaf clusters
Air Force Commendation Medal with oak leaf cluster
Air Force Outstanding Unit Award with oak leaf cluster
Air Force Organizational Excellence Award with oak leaf cluster
National Defense Service Medal with one bronze service star
Global War on Terrorism Service Medal
Nuclear Deterrence Operations Service Medal
Air Force Overseas Short Tour Service Ribbon
Air Force Overseas Long Tour Service Ribbon with oak leaf cluster
Air Force Longevity Service Award with one silver and two bronze oak leaf clusters
Small Arms Expert Marksmanship Ribbon
Air Force Training Ribbon

Military offices
Preceded by Steven J. Lepper	Deputy Judge Advocate General of the United States Air Force; 2014–2018	Succeeded by Charles L. Plummer
Preceded by Christopher F. Burne	Judge Advocate General of the United States Air Force; 2018–2022	Succeeded by Charles L. Plummer
