= Thomas B. Bruton =

United States Air Force general (1930–2022)

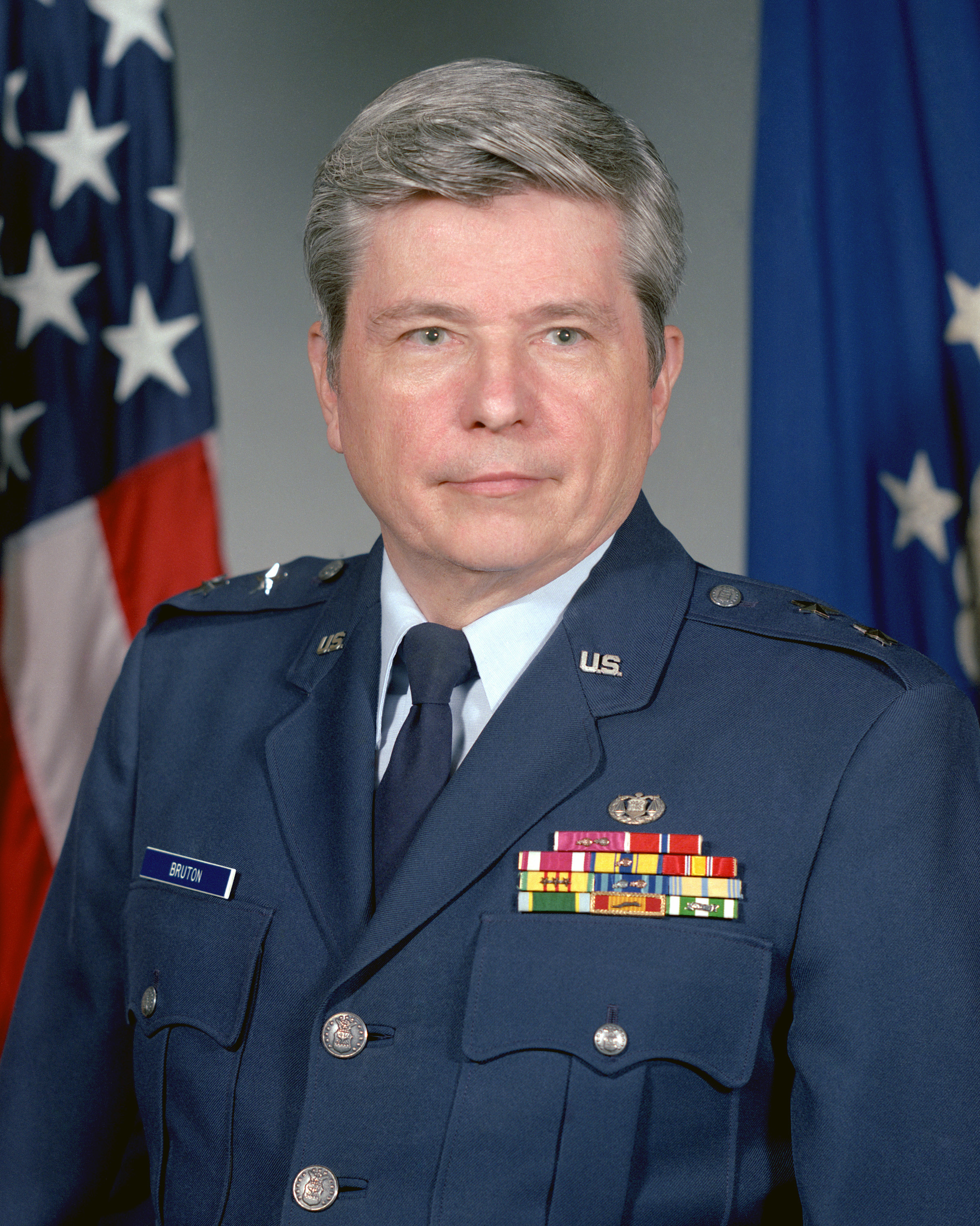
- Born: August 30, 1930; Weslaco, Texas, U.S.
- Died: December 28, 2022 (aged 92); Winston-Salem, North Carolina, U.S.
- Military career
- Allegiance: United States
- Branch: United States Air Force
- Service years: 1954–1985
- Rank: Major General
- Commands: United States Air Force Judge Advocate General's Corps

Thomas Barmore Bruton (August 30, 1930 – December 28, 2022) was a major general in the United States Air Force. He was the United States Air Force Judge Advocate General from 1980 to 1985.

== Biography ==
Bruton was the son of Lausane Thomas Bruton and Helen G. (Cowgill) Bruton. He was born in 1930 in Texas, and raised in Colorado. Bruton graduated from Colorado Springs High School in 1947. Bruton holds a B.S. degree in business from the University of Colorado Boulder, a law degree from the University of Colorado Law School (1954) and master's degrees from George Washington University (1966) and Auburn University (1971). Received his commission through the Air Force Reserve Officer Training Corps program (1954). Served from 1954 until August 1956 as assistant staff judge advocate at McGuire Air Force Base. General Bruton is also a graduate of the Air Command and Staff College (1965) and the Air War College (1971), both located at Maxwell Air Force Base, Ala. Bruton died at the Salemtowne Retirement Community in Winston-Salem, North Carolina on December 28, 2022, at the age of 92.

== Military awards ==
| Judge Advocate Badge |

| Legion of Merit with two bronze oak leaf clusters |
| Bronze Star Medal |
| Meritorious Service Medal |
| Air Force Commendation Medal with one oak leaf cluster |
| National Defense Service Medal |
| Vietnam Service Medal with three bronze service stars |
| Air Force Longevity Service Award with six oak leaf clusters |
| Armed Forces Reserve Medal |
| Small Arms Expert Marksmanship Ribbon |
| Gallantry Cross Unit Citation Emblem with Palm and Frame |
| Vietnam Campaign Medal |
