= United States Air Force Judge Advocate General's Corps =

Judge Advocate General's Corps
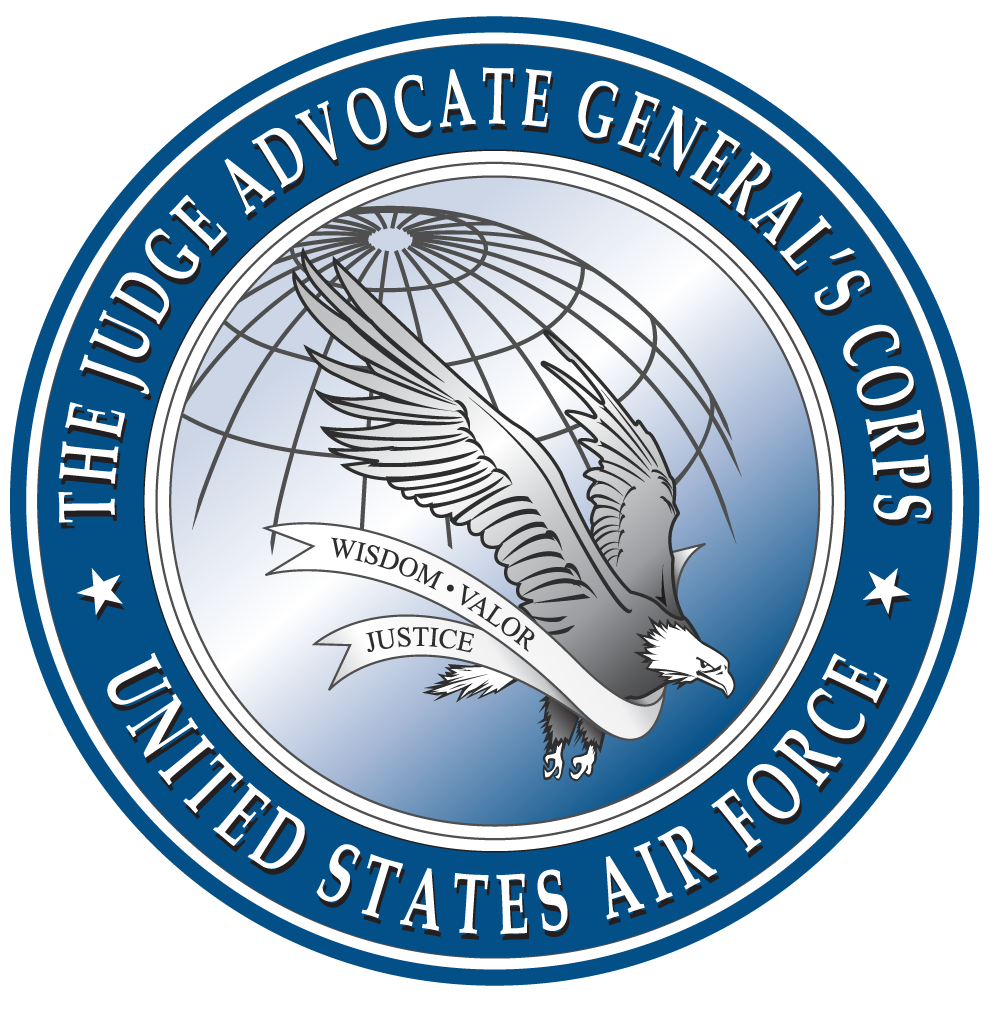
- Active: 1967 – present
- Country: United States of America
- Type: Military justice
- Role: Legal and policy advice to the Secretary of the Air Force
- Part of: United States Air Force

The Judge Advocate General's Corps also known as the "JAG Corps" or "JAG" is the legal arm of the United States Air Force.

== History ==
The United States Air Force became a separate military service in September 1947. On June 25, 1948, Congress established an office of the Judge Advocate General (TJAG) in the United States Air Force. On July 8, 1949, the Air Force chief of staff designated 205 attorneys Air Force Judge Advocates. Thus, there were Air Force judge advocates three months before there was an Air Force judge advocate general. Following the promulgation of enabling legislation, the Air Force Judge Advocate General's Department was established on January 25, 1949, by Department of the Air Force General Order No. 7 (as amended by General Order No. 17, May 15, 1949). While this event was clearly the birth of the department, it really represented an interim step, providing the Air Force authority to administer its military justice system within the existing Air Force structure of the time until other legislation (what became the Uniform Code of Military Justice) could be developed and enacted. The department was originally a part of the Air Force Personnel Branch but became a separate entity reporting directly to the Air Force chief of staff in February 1950. The first Air Force judge advocate general, Major General Reginald C. Harmon, believed it important for Air Force JAGs to remain a part of a functionally interconnected military department. For that reason, the concept of a separate corps was discarded in favor of the department that existed until 2003.

Judge Advocate badge.

In 2003, the Judge Advocate General's Department was renamed to the Judge Advocate General's Corps by order of the secretary of the Air Force, James G. Roche. In December 2004, the Air Force Judge Advocate General, Thomas J. Fiscus, accepted non-judicial punishment under Article 15 of the UCMJ, for conduct unbecoming of an officer and obstruction of justice related to numerous unprofessional sexual relationships with subordinates. Upon his retirement, Fiscus was reduced two grades, to colonel. Major General Jack Rives, the deputy judge advocate general, became the Air Force judge advocate general as of February 2006. On July 23, 2008, General Rives was confirmed as a lieutenant general, becoming the first TJAG to hold that rank.

On December 15, 2009, the president nominated Brigadier General Richard C. Harding to serve as the 16th judge advocate general. On February 2, 2010, the Senate Armed Services Committee endorsed the nomination and the Senate voted to confirm the nomination. Lieutenant General Rives retired on February 5, 2010, accepting the position of executive director and chief operating officer of the American Bar Association, and now-Lieutenant General Richard Harding became the 16th judge advocate general of the Air Force. His formal investiture and promotion ceremony occurred on February 23, 2010. General Harding's term as the judge advocate general ended on January 31, 2014.

On May 22, 2014, the Senate confirmed Brigadier General Christopher F. Burne to serve as the 17th judge advocate general in the grade of lieutenant general. He was promoted and began duties as The Judge Advocate General on the following day. Lieutenant General Burne's term as The Judge Advocate General ended on May 18, 2018.

On January 30, 2018, the Senate confirmed Major General Jeffrey A. Rockwell, who was then serving as deputy judge advocate general, to serve as the 18th judge advocate general in the grade of lieutenant general. That same day, the Senate also confirmed Brigadier General Charles L. Plummer to serve as Deputy Judge Advocate General in the grade of major general. Lieutenant General Rockwell's formal investiture ceremony occurred on May 21, 2018.

== JAG School ==
The Air Force Judge Advocate General's School was founded in 1950 and has been located in the William Louis Dickinson Law Center, at Maxwell Air Force Base in Montgomery, Alabama, since 1993. The school provides instruction to new judge advocates and paralegals, in addition to offering approximately 30 continuing legal education courses. The school publishes scholarly legal journals such as The Air Force Law Review, semiannually, and The Reporter online. The school also produces The Military Commander and the Law, a publication that is invaluable not only to judge advocates, but commanders and first sergeants in handling the myriad of legal issues that arise with a squadron or wing, and for the continued enforcement of good order and discipline.

== List of judge advocates general of the Air Force ==
No.	Judge Advocate General		Term		
No.	Portrait	Name	Took office	Left office	Term length
1	Reginald C. Harmon	Major General; Reginald C. Harmon	1948	1960	~12 years
3	Albert M. Kuhfeld	Major General; Albert M. Kuhfeld	1960	1964	~4 years
3	Robert W. Manss	Major General; Robert W. Manss	1964	1969	~5 years
4	James S. Cheney	Major General; James S. Cheney	1970	1973	~3 years
5	Harold R. Vague	Major General; Harold R. Vague	1973	1977	~4 years
6	Walter D. Reed	Major General; Walter D. Reed	1977	1980	~3 years
7	Thomas B. Bruton	Major General; Thomas B. Bruton	1980	1985	~5 years
8	Robert W. Norris	Major General; Robert W. Norris	1985	1988	~3 years
9	Keithe E. Nelson	Major General; Keithe E. Nelson	1988	1991	~3 years
10	David C. Morehouse	Major General; David C. Morehouse	1991	1993	~2 years
11	Nolan Sklute	Major General; Nolan Sklute	1993	1996	~3 years
12	William A. Moorman	Major General; William A. Moorman	1999	2002	~3 years
13	Thomas J. Fiscus	Major General; Thomas J. Fiscus	2002	2004	~2 years
-	Jack L. Rives	Major General; Jack L. Rives; Acting	2004	2006	~2 years
14	Jack L. Rives	Lieutenant General; Jack L. Rives	2006	2010	~4 years
15	Richard C. Harding	Lieutenant General; Richard C. Harding	February 2010	January 2014	~3 years, 334 days
16	Christopher F. Burne	Lieutenant General; Christopher F. Burne	May 2014	June 2018	~4 years
17	Jeffrey A. Rockwell	Lieutenant General; Jeffrey A. Rockwell	May 2018	~26 May 2022	~4 years, 25 days
18	Charles L. Plummer	Lieutenant General; Charles L. Plummer	~26 May 2022	21 February 2025	~2 years, 271 days
-	Rebecca R. Vernon	Major General; Rebecca R. Vernon; Acting	21 February 2025	21 October 2025	242 days
-	Mitchel Neurock	Major General; Mitchel Neurock; Acting	21 October 2025	17 February 2026	119 days
19	Christopher A. Eason	Major General; Christopher A. Eason	18 February 2026	present	173 days

== See also ==
- General Counsel of the Air Force
- Air Force Court of Criminal Appeals
- U.S. Army Judge Advocate General's Corps
- U.S. Navy Judge Advocate General's Corps
- U.S. Marine Corps Judge Advocate Division
- U.S. Coast Guard Legal Division
- Judge Advocate General's Corps
- Judge Advocate General
- Military justice
- Air Force Office of Special Investigations
- United Kingdom
  - Judge Advocate of the Fleet
  - Judge Advocate General (United Kingdom)
- Canada
  - Judge Advocate General (Canada)
