= Thomas J. Fiscus =

United States Air Force general

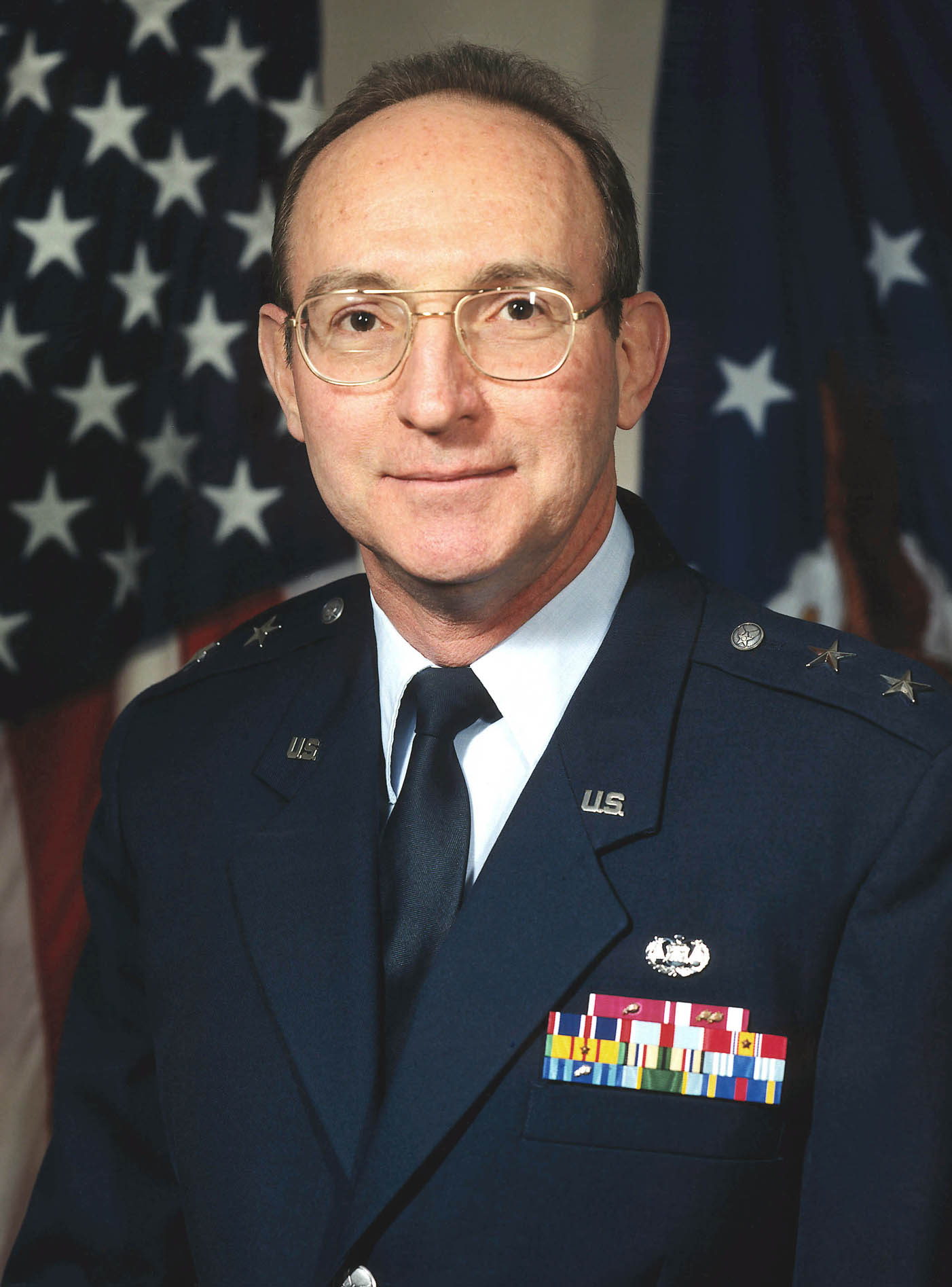
Thomas J. Fiscus

Thomas J. Fiscus was a Major General in the United States Air Force who served as Judge Advocate General of the Air Force, the highest-ranking officer in the Judge Advocate General's Corps. In 2004, Fiscus was punished for conduct unbecoming an officer and several other offenses after an investigation found that he engaged in improper relationships with more than a dozen women. Fiscus received a formal reprimand and forfeitures of pay under Article 15 of the Uniform Code of Military Justice for conduct unbecoming, fraternization, obstruction of justice and violating a lawful general regulation. He was reduced in rank to colonel, effective 1 February 2005.

Fiscus was the Air Force's judge advocate general from February 2002 until he asked to be relieved in September 2004 when the allegations against him came under investigation. As the Air Force's top lawyer, he oversaw the work of 3,200 employees, including more than 1,300 Air Force judge advocates.

Fiscus was one of the military lawyers who argued against the harsh interrogation techniques approved by Defense Secretary Donald H. Rumsfeld in December 2002 for detainees at Guantanamo Bay, Cuba.
