= Robert W. Norris =

United States Air Force general (1932–2024)

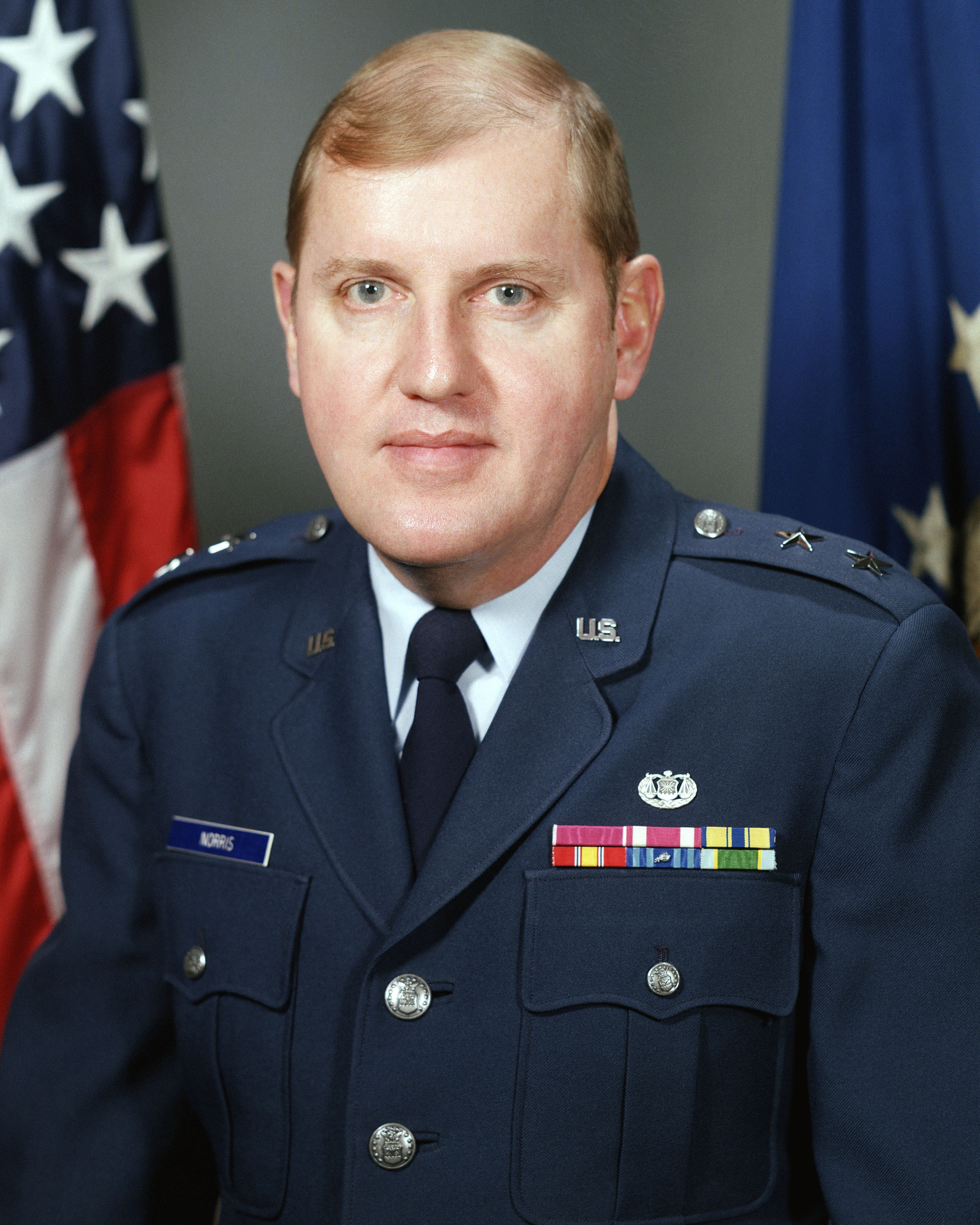
- Born: May 22, 1932; Birmingham, Alabama, U.S.
- Died: May 12, 2024 (aged 91); Birmingham, Alabama, U.S.
- Alma mater: University of Alabama (JD); George Washington University (LLM)
- Military career
- Allegiance: United States
- Branch: United States Air Force
- Service years: 1955–1988
- Rank: Major General
- Commands: United States Air Force Judge Advocate General's Corps

Robert W. Norris (May 22, 1932 – May 12, 2024) was an American major general in the United States Air Force. He was the United States Air Force Judge Advocate General from 1985 to 1988. Norris holds a Juris Doctor degree from the University of Alabama Law School and a Master of Laws degree from The George Washington University Law School.

Norris died on May 12, 2024, at the age of 91.
