= Christopher F. Burne =

United States general

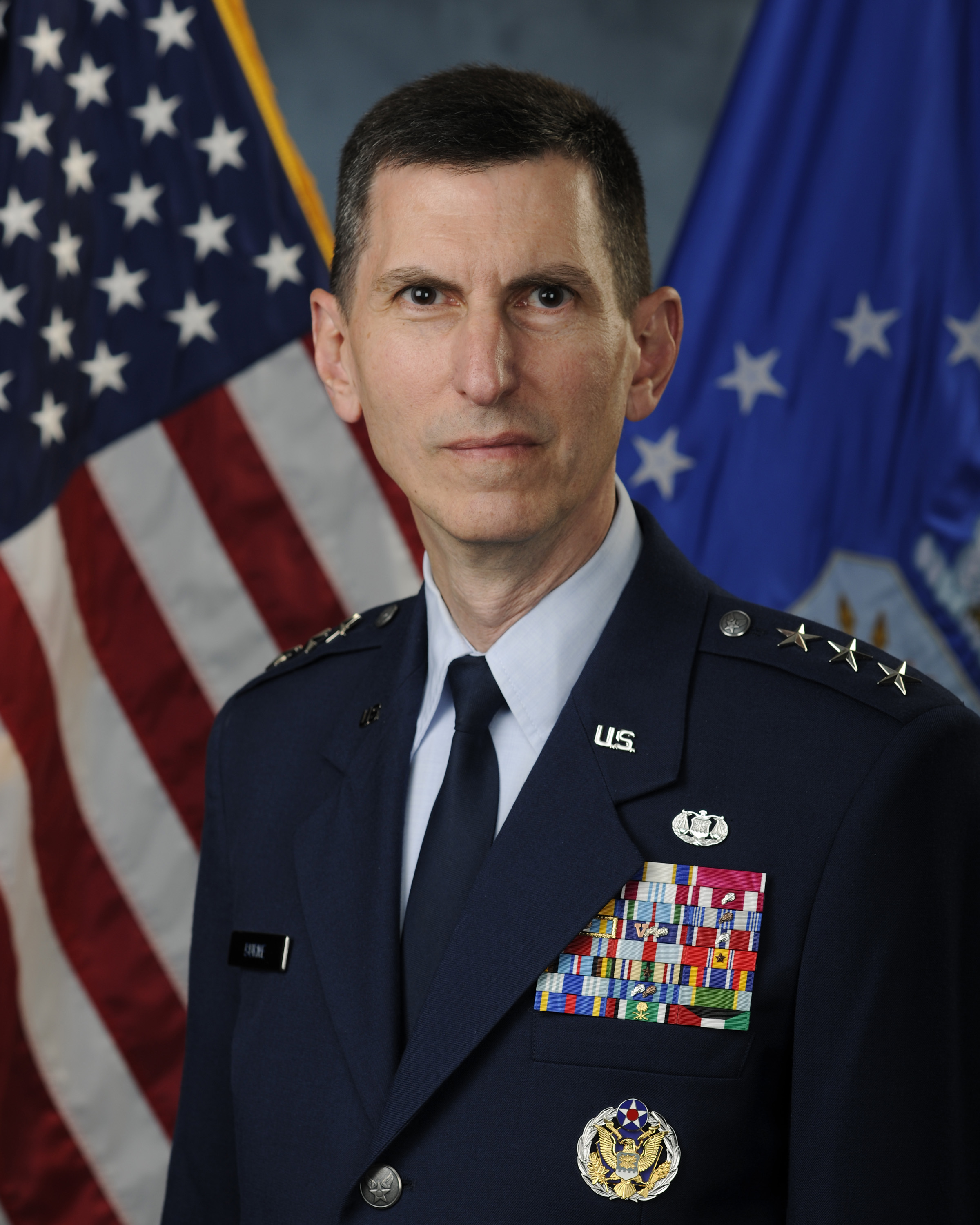
- Official portrait, 2014
- Born: October 7, 1958 (age 67); Dunmore, Pennsylvania, U.S.
- Allegiance: United States
- Branch: United States Air Force
- Rank: Lieutenant General
- Commands: United States Air Force Judge Advocate General's Corps
- Spouse: Robin Renee Pond (m.1988)

Christopher Francis Burne is a retired United States Air Force lieutenant general and was Judge Advocate General of the Air Force from May 2014 until May 2018. He retired on July 1, 2018.

== Biography ==
Christopher Francis Burne was born on October 6, 1958, in Dunmore, Pennsylvania, Burne's father Francis Robert Burne was a decorated bombardier in World War II. Burne attended the University of Scranton and Pennsylvania State University - Dickinson Law.

== Career ==
Burne joined the Air Force in 1983 and was assigned to the Eighth Air Force. In 1987, he was assigned to Headquarters Strategic Air Command. He served as Offutt Air Force Base from 1989 until 1990, when he was assigned to Vandenberg Air Force Base. There, he was Deputy Staff Judge Advocate with the Western Space and Missile Center and the Twentieth Air Force. He would later deploy to serve in the Gulf War.

In 1993, Burne was stationed at Soesterberg Air Base in the Netherlands. From there, he became Director, Operations Law, United States Central Command and Staff Judge Advocate of the 20th Fighter Wing.

Following the September 11 attacks, he took part in organizing the Air Force's mobilization and response.

In May 2014, he was confirmed by the Senate to be The Judge Advocate General of the Air Force. Prior to this, he was assigned as the Staff Judge Advocate at Headquarters Air Combat Command. Burne retired from the Judge Advocate General position on July 1, 2018.

== Awards and decorations ==
Judge Advocate Badge
Headquarters Air Force Badge

Air Force Distinguished Service Medal with oak leaf cluster
Legion of Merit
Defense Meritorious Service Medal
Meritorious Service Medal with one silver oak leaf cluster
Air Force Commendation Medal with oak leaf cluster
Joint Service Achievement Medal
Air Force Achievement Medal with oak leaf cluster
Joint Meritorious Unit Award with oak leaf cluster
Air Force Outstanding Unit Award with Valor device and two silver oak leaf clusters
Air Force Organizational Excellence Award with silver oak leaf cluster
Combat Readiness Medal
Air Force Recognition Ribbon
National Defense Service Medal with one bronze service star
Armed Forces Expeditionary Medal
Southwest Asia Service Medal with one service star
Global War on Terrorism Service Medal
Air Force Overseas Long Tour Service Ribbon
Air Force Longevity Service Award with one silver and three bronze oak leaf clusters
Small Arms Expert Marksmanship Ribbon
Air Force Training Ribbon
Kuwait Liberation Medal (Saudi Arabia)
Kuwait Liberation Medal (Kuwait)
