= National Space Intelligence Center =

US Space Force intelligence center

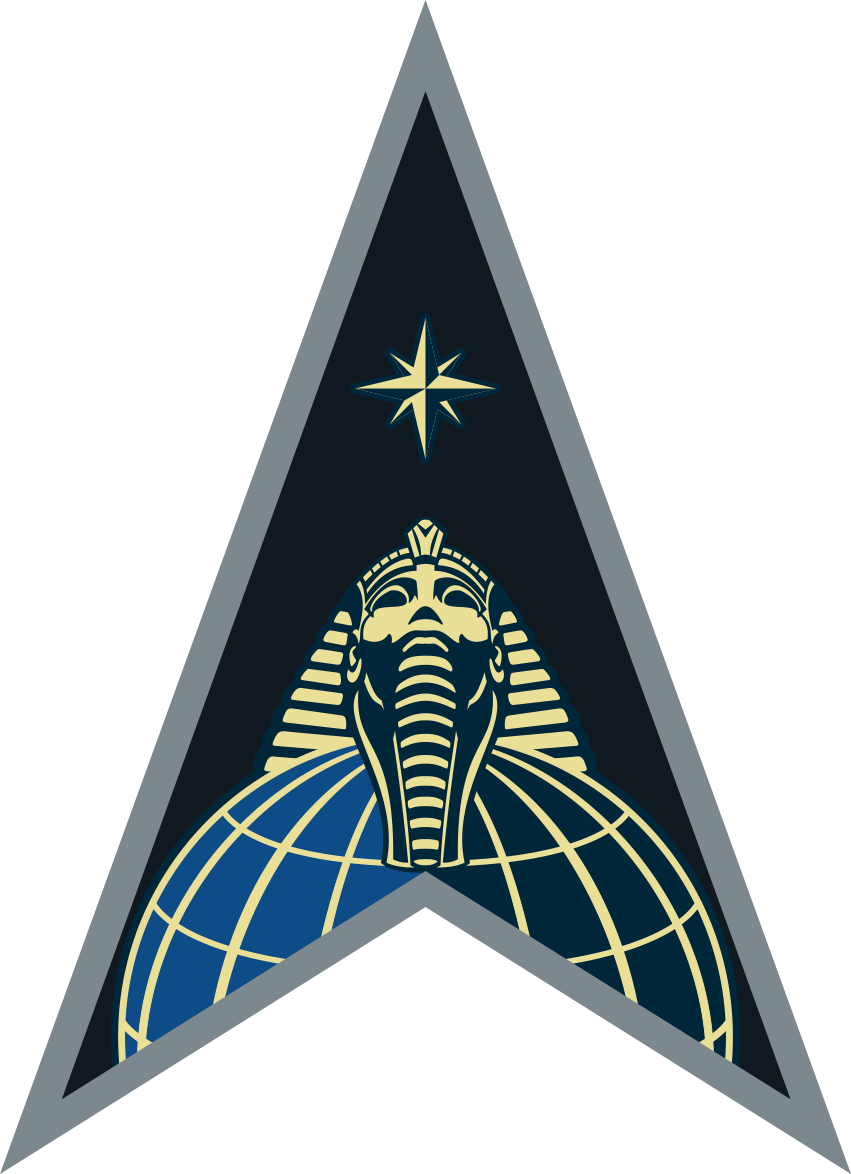
- Emblem
- Active: 24 June 2022–present
- Country: United States
- Branch: United States Space Force
- Type: Field Operating Agency
- Role: Space intelligence
- Size: 350 personnel (expected)
- Part of: Deputy Chief of Space Operations for Intelligence
- Headquarters: Wright-Patterson Air Force Base, Ohio

Commanders
- Commander: Col Patrick Hamlin
- Deputy Director: Cheryl Richmond
- Senior Enlisted Leader: CMSgt Kyle Lewis

The National Space Intelligence Center (NSIC) formerly known as "Space Delta 18" or "DEL 18", is the United States Space Force's intelligence agency. It is headquartered at Wright-Patterson Air Force Base, Ohio, and activated on 24 June 2022.

NSIC is a field operating agency that is responsible for performing national and military space missions and evaluating capabilities, performance, limitations, and vulnerabilities of space and counter-space systems and services. It is the Space Force's counterpart to the Army's National Ground Intelligence Center, Navy's Office of Naval Intelligence, and the Air Force's National Air and Space Intelligence Center (NASIC).

== History ==
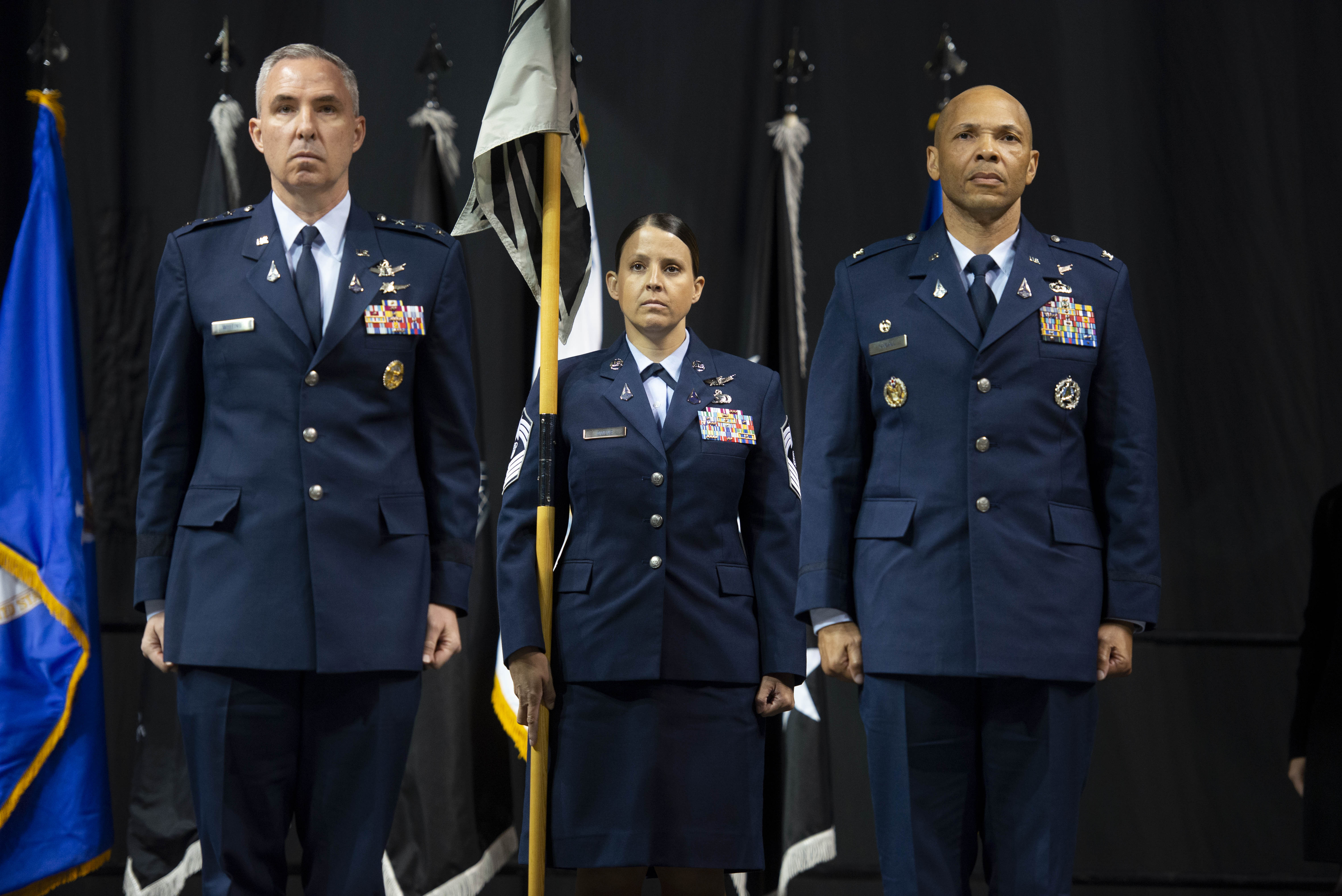
Lt Gen Whiting (left) and Col Randall (right) stand at attention during the activation of Space Delta 18, 24th June 2022

The establishment of NSIC was ordered by Chief of Space Operations John W. Raymond. It will be formed by transferring NASIC's Space Analysis Squadron and Counter-Space Analysis Squadron from the Space and Missiles Analysis Group to the Space Force. Then Air Force Major General Leah Lauderback, the Space Force director of intelligence (S2)—to whom the center will ultimately report—led the planning effort. Congressional authorization is needed to create a field operating agency that reports directly to the S2.

Awaiting funding for the establishment of the NSIC, the Space Force stood up the Space Force Intelligence Activity (SFIA) on 24 September 2021 as an interim unit. SFIA served under NASIC until the establishment of NSIC. On 24 June 2022, NSIC was activated as Space Delta 18.

On 28 June 2024, DEL 18 and NSIC were transferred from SpOC and redesignated as a field operating agency (FOA) under the deputy chief of space operations for intelligence. As part of the elevation to FOA, it was redesignated to the National Space Intelligence Center, losing the name Space Delta 18.

== Symbolism ==
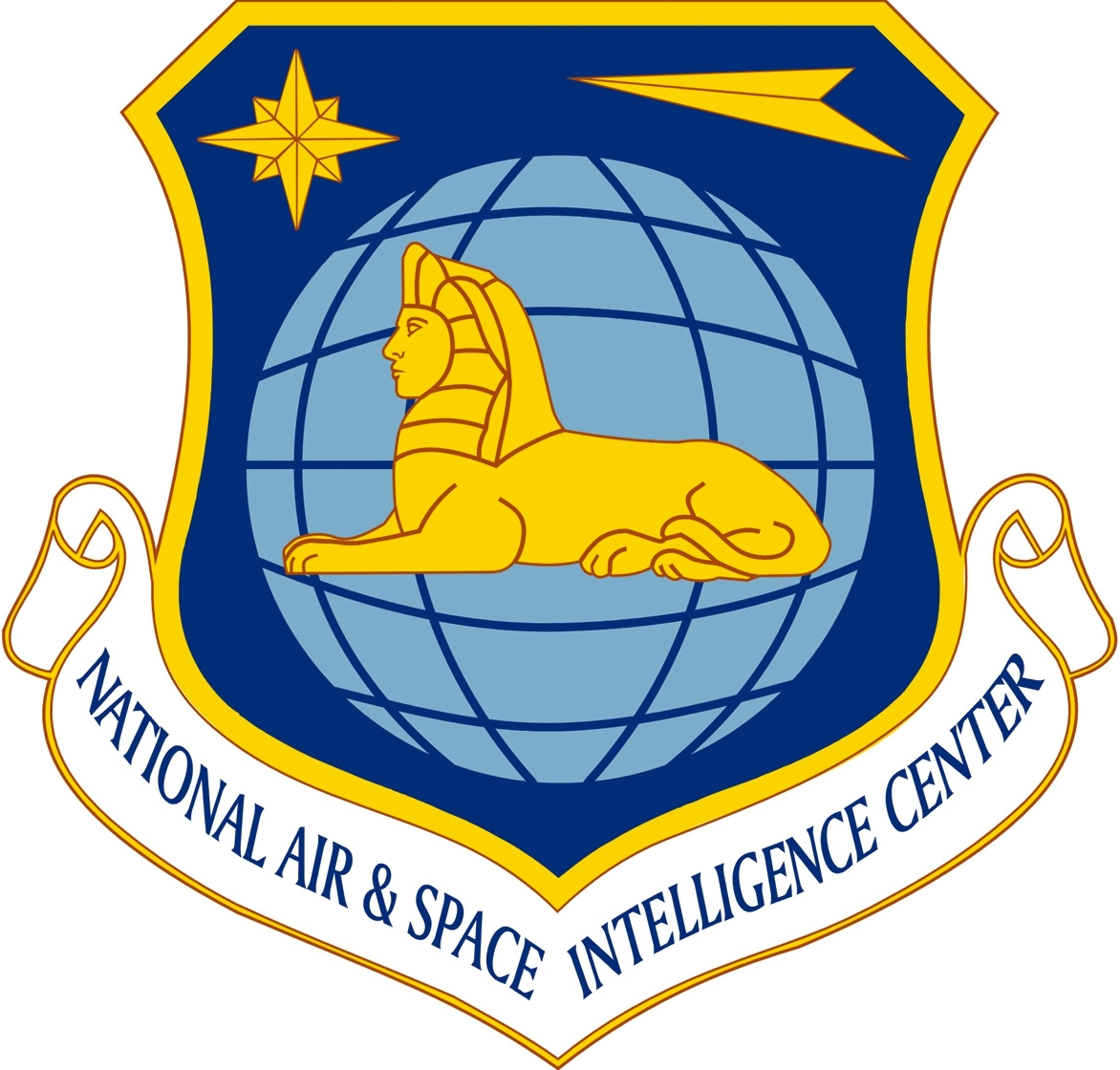
Emblem of the National Air and Space Intelligence Center, NSIC's direct predecessor in the U.S. Air Force.

The National Space Intelligence Center emblem design incorporates elements from the intelligence and space communities, its National Air and Space Intelligence Center heritage, and looks to the future. It consists of the following elements:

- Platinum is the distinctive color of Space Operations Command and represents the strength of its uniformed and civilian Guardians, the rarity of its calling, and the nobility of its mission.
- The sphinx is an ancient Egyptian symbol of wisdom, knowledge, and the challenges that the National Space Intelligence Center will solve. It is invoked out of pride in an organization that traces roots to the earliest days of intelligence. It sits omnipresent over the world – just like the space domain, gazing upward, drawing eyes from the past into the future and the blackness of space.
- The North Star's eight points symbolize points of a compass and displays how intelligence professionals will analyze and access to guide acquisitions, policymakers, and warfighters.

Under its previous designation as Space Delta 18, DEL 18 took on the number 18 in honor of the Space Force becoming the 18th member of the United States Intelligence Community on 15 January 2021.

== Structure ==
In 2022 NSIC was initially composed of two squadrons transferred from NASIC's Space and Missiles Analysis Group. There now appear to be four Intelligence Analysis Squadrons (IAS), as of mid-2025.

- 1st Intelligence Analysis Squadron, Wright-Patterson Air Force Base, Ohio
- 2nd Intelligence Analysis Squadron, Wright-Patterson Air Force Base, Ohio
- 3rd Intelligence Analysis Squadron, Wright-Patterson Air Force Base, Ohio
- 4th Intelligence Analysis Squadron, Wright-Patterson Air Force Base, Ohio

== List of commanders ==
No.	Commander		Term			Ref
No.	Portrait	Name	Took office	Left office	Duration	Ref
1	Marqus D. Randall	Colonel; Marqus D. Randall	24 June 2022	28 June 2024	2 years, 4 days	
2	Marcus D. Starks	Colonel; Marcus D. Starks	28 June 2024	9 July 2026	2 years, 11 days	
3	Patrick W. Hamlin	Colonel; Patrick W. Hamlin	9 July 2026	Incumbent	100 days	

== See also ==
- Missile and Space Intelligence Center
- Space Delta 7
