= National Air and Space Intelligence Center =

United States Air Force unit

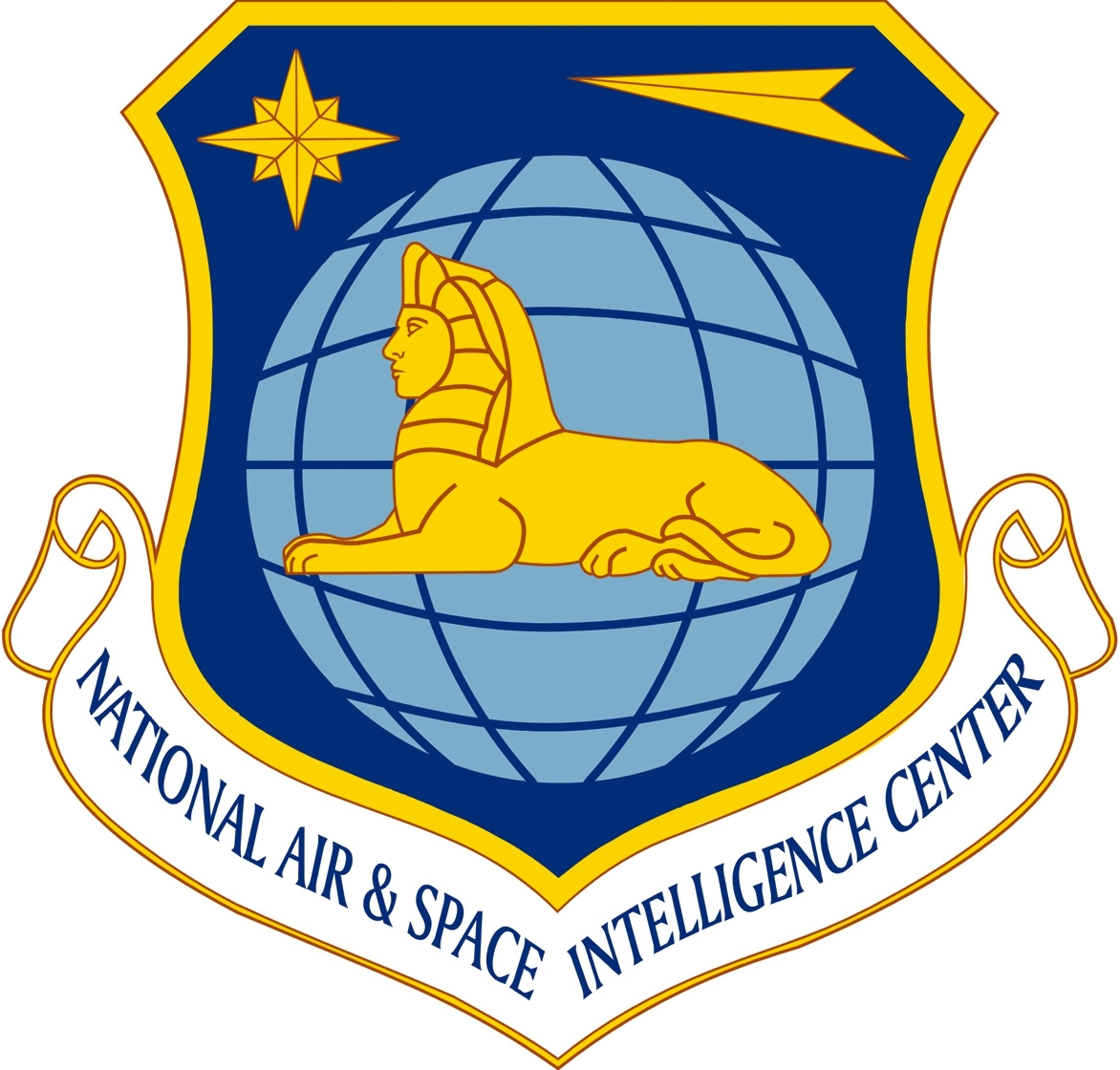
- Active: July 1961 – present
- Country: United States
- Branch: United States Air Force
- Part of: Air Staff A2/6
- Garrison/HQ: Wright-Patterson Air Force Base
- Decorations: Air and Space Organizational Excellence Award
- Website: Official website

The National Air and Space Intelligence Center (NASIC) is the United States Air Force unit for analyzing military intelligence on foreign air forces, weapons, and systems. NASIC assessments of aerospace performance characteristics, capabilities, and vulnerabilities are used to shape national security and defense policies and support weapons treaty negotiations and verification. NASIC provides the Defense Intelligence Agency (DIA) with specialized intelligence regarding foreign air threats.

== History ==
In 1917 the Foreign Data Section of the Army Signal Corps' Airplane Engineering Department was established at McCook Field, and a NASIC predecessor operated the Army Aeronautical Museum (now National Museum of the Air Force) initially at McCook and then on 22 August 1935 at Wright Field in Dayton, Ohio. The Office of the Chief of Air Corps's Information Division had become the OCAC Intelligence Division by 1939, which transferred into the United States Army Air Forces (USAAF) as AC/AS, Intelligence and was known as A-2 (in April, 1942, the Air Intelligence School was at the Harrisburg Academy.) The United States Army Air Forces evaluated foreign aircraft during World War II with the "T-2 Intelligence Department at Wright Field and Freeman Field, Indiana". In July 1944, Wright Field analysts fired a V-1 engine reconstructed from "Robot Blitz" wreckage (an entire V-1 was reconstructed at Republic Aviation by 8 September). Post-war, Operation Lusty recruited German technology experts who were interrogated prior to working in the United States, e.g., Dr. Herbert Wagner at a Point Mugu USMC detachment and Walter Dornberger at Bell Aircraft. The "capability…anticipated for Soviet intercontinental jet bombers" (e.g., in NSC 20/4 in the fall of 1945) determined a Radar Fence was needed for sufficient U.S. warning and that the "1954 Interceptor" (F-106) was needed (specified in the 13 January 1949, Air Development Order): "the appearance of a Soviet jet bomber [was in the] 1954…May Day parade".

"By 1944, it had become obvious that German aeronautical technology was superior in many ways, to that of this country, and we needed to obtain this technology and make use of it," said P-47 and Messerschmitt Me 262 pilot USAAF Lieutenant Roy Brown during a speech at NASIC in 2014. To accomplish this task, then Colonel Harold E. Watson was sent from Wright Field to Europe in 1944, to locate German aircraft of advanced design. Watson would become an integral part of forming the intelligence unit that would eventually become NASIC.

=== Air Technical Intelligence Center ===
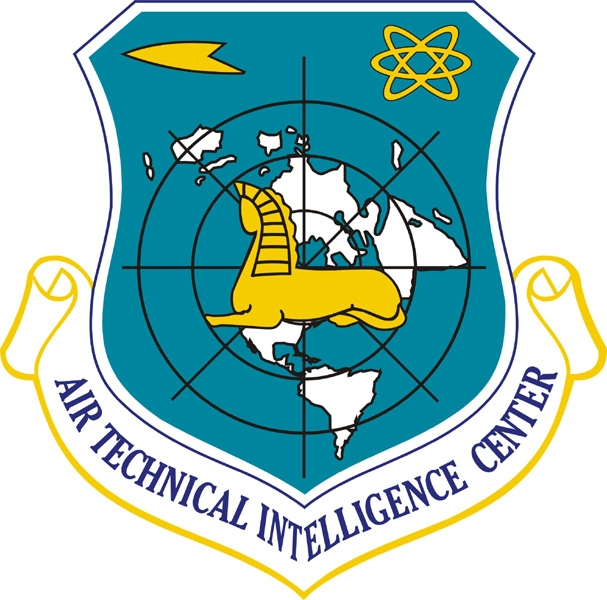
Emblem of Air Technical Intelligence Center

On 21 May 1951, the Air Technical Intelligence Center (ATIC) was established as a USAF field activity of the Assistant Chief of Staff for Intelligence. ATIC analyzed engine parts and the tail section of a Mikoyan-Gurevich MiG-15 and in July, the center received a complete MiG-15 that had crashed. ATIC also obtained IL-10 and Yak-9 aircraft in operational condition, and monitored a captured MiG-15's flight test program. ATIC awarded a contract to Battelle Memorial Institute for translation and analysis of materiel and documents gathered during the Korean War. Analysis allowed FEAF to develop fighter engagement tactics. In 1958 ATIC had a Readix Computer in Building 828, 1 of 6 WPAFB buildings used by the unit prior to the center built in 1976.

Discoverer 29 (launched 30 April 1961) then photographed the "first Soviet ICBM offensive launch complex" at Plesetsk. The Defense Intelligence Agency was created on 1 October.

=== Foreign Technology Division ===
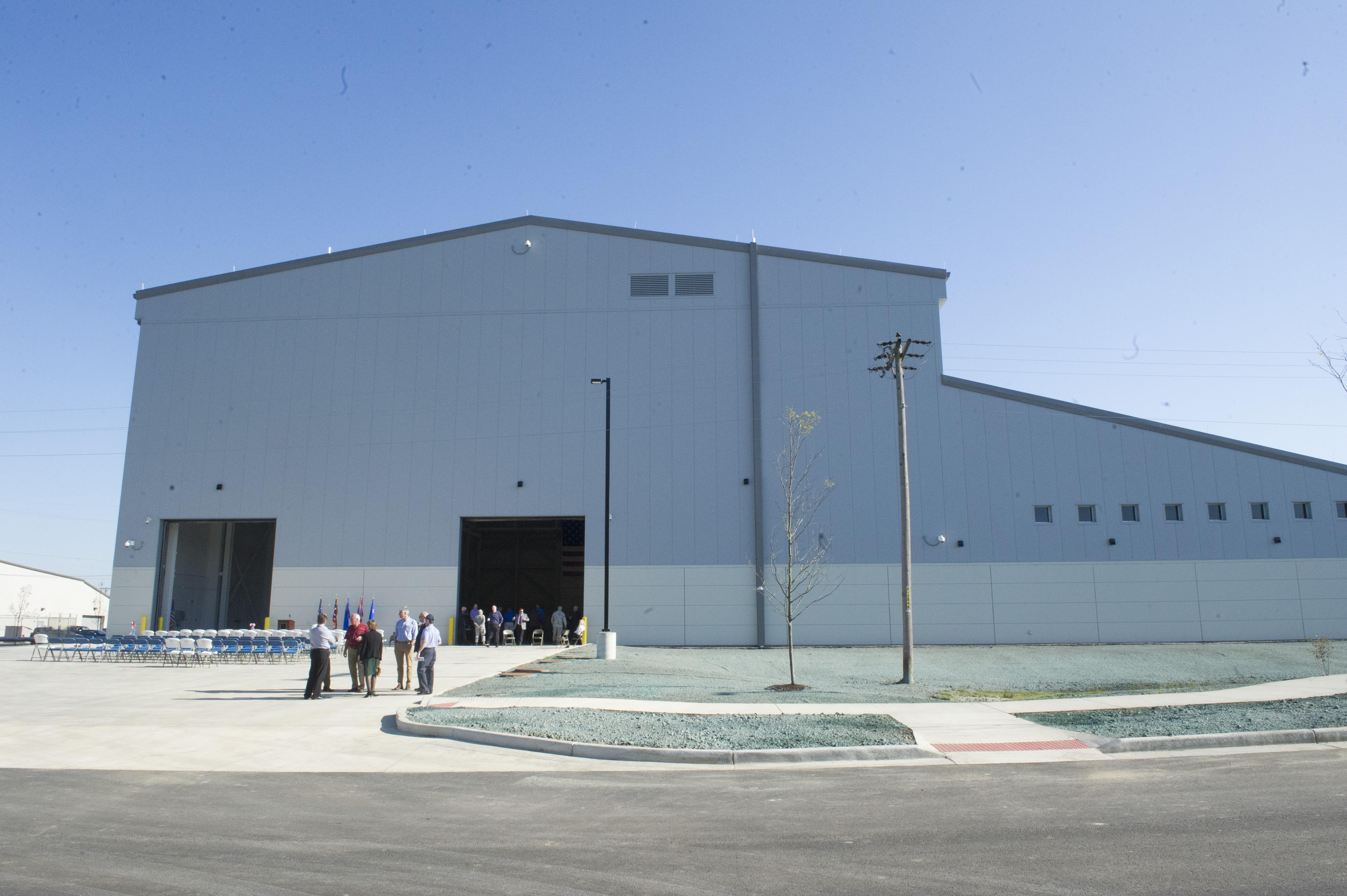
National Air and Space Intelligence Center, new Foreign Materiels Exploitation (FME) center at Wright-Paterson Air Force Base.

In 1961 ATIC became the Foreign Technology Division (FTD) which was reassigned to Air Force Systems Command (AFSC). FTD intelligence estimates were subsequently provided to the National Security Council. At Tonopah Test Range Airport, FTD conducted test and evaluation of captured Soviet fighter aircraft. The pilots were recruited from the Air Force Test Center at Edwards AFB. The aircraft of the 1966 Iraqi Air Force MiG-21 defection was loaned by Israel to the U.S. Air Force and transferred to Nevada for study. In 1968, the US Air Force and Navy HAVE DOUGHNUT project flew the aircraft at Area 51 for simulated air combat training (renamed HAVE DRILL and transferred to the Tonopah TTR c. 1968). U.S. casualties flying foreign aircraft included those in the 1979 Tonopah MiG-17 crash during training versus a Northrop F-5 and the 1984 Little Skull Mountain MiG-23 crash which killed a USAF general.

FTD detachments were located in Virginia, California (Det 2), Germany (Det 3), Japan (Det 4), and Det 5—first in Massachusetts and later Colorado (Buckley ANGB). By 1968 FTD had an "Aerial Phenomenon Office" and in 1983, FTD/OLAI at the Cheyenne Mountain Complex published the Analysis of Cosmos 1220 and Cosmos 1306 Fragments.

In 1971 the FTD obtained, translated, and published a copy of the paper Method of Edge Waves in the Physical Theory of Diffraction, originally a Russian-language work by Pyotr Ufimtsev of the Central Research Radio Engineering Institute [ЦНИРТИ] of the Defense Ministry of the Soviet Union, which became the basis for stealth aircraft technology.

=== National Air Intelligence Center ===
In October 1993 at the end of the Cold War, FTD became the National Air Intelligence Center as "a component of the Air Intelligence Agency", and by 2005 had a Signals Exploitation Division SAM.gov | Home after being renamed the National Air and Space Intelligence Center on 15 February 2003.

NASIC's Defense Intelligence Space Threat Committee coordinates "a wide variety of complex space/counterspace analytical activities." The Center includes a library with interlibrary loan to Air University, etc.

NASIC opened Intelligence Production Complex III (IPC III) at Wright-Patterson AFB in May 2024. Construction began in 2020, and the Air Force says the facility was completed on time and on budget.

== Organization ==
NASIC is an operation wing and Field Operating Agency (FOA) of the USAF; as an FOA, it reports to the Air Staff through the Deputy Chief of Staff for ISR and Cyber Effects Operations. The Center is led by a Commander, currently Col. Kenneth A. Stremmel, and has an annual budget of over $507 million.

NASIC's 4,100 civilian, military, Reserve, National Guard, and contract personnel are split between the Centers' four intelligence analysis groups, four support directorates, and 18 squadrons.

The Air and Cyberspace Intelligence Group; Geospatial and Signatures Intelligence Group; Global Exploitation Intelligence Group; and Space, Missiles and Forces Intelligence Group comprise the four intelligence groups; the Directorate of Communications and Information, Directorate of Personnel, Directorate of Facilities and Logistics, and Directorate of Plans and Operations comprise the four support directorates.

== Lineage ==
- Established, activated, and organized as Foreign Technology Division on 1 July 1961

Redesignated: Air Force Foreign Technology Center on 1 October 1991
Redesignated: Foreign Aerospace Science and Technology Center on 1 January 1992
Redesignated: National Air Intelligence Center on 1 October 1993
Redesignated: National Air and Space Intelligence Center on 20 February 2003

== Assignments ==
- Air Force Systems Command, 1 July 1961 – 30 September 1991
- Air Force Intelligence Command (later redesignated Air Intelligence Agency, Air Force ISR Agency, then Twenty-Fifth Air Force), 1 October 1991 – 30 September 2014
  - NOTE: On 11 October 2019, Twenty-Fifth Air Force merged with Twenty-Fourth Air Force to form Sixteenth Air Force
- Air Staff (United States), Headquarters U.S. Air Force/A2, 1 October 2014 – present

== List of commanders ==
- Brig. Gen. Arthur J. Pierce, February 1961 – July 1964
- Brig. Gen. Arthur W. Cruikshank Jr., July 1964 – August 1966
- Col. Raymond S. Sleeper, August 1966 – November 1968
- Col. George R. Weinbrenner, November 1968 – July 1974
- Col. James W. Rawers, July 1974 – July 1975
- Col. John B. Marks, Jr., July 1975 – January 1977
- Col. Howard E. Wright, January 1977 – June 1981
- Col. David S. Watrous, June 1981 – February 1983
- Col. Earl A. Pontius, February 1983 – June 1986
- Col. Gary Culp, June 1986 – August 1988
- Brig. Gen. Francis C. Gideon, August 1988 – June 1992
- Col. James E. Miller, Jr., June 1992 – July 1994
- Col. Gary D. Payton, July 1994 – August 1996
- Col. Kenneth K. Dumm, August 1996 – December 1997
- Col. Richard G. Annas, December 1997 – September 2000
- Col. Steven R. Capenos, September 2000 – July 2002
- Col. Mark C. Christian, July 2002 – September 2004
- Col. Joseph J. Pridotkas, September 2004 – July 2006
- Col. Karen A. Cleary, July 2006 – June 2008
- Col. D. Scott George (BG Select), June 2008 – June 2010
- Col. Kathleen C. Sakura, June 2010 – May 2012
- Col. Aaron M. Prupas, May 2012 – June 2014
- Col. Leah G. Lauderback, June 2014 – May 2016
- Col. Sean P. Larkin, May 2016 – June 2018
- Col. Parker H. Wright, 28 June 2018 – May 2020
- Col. Maurizio D. Calabrese, 9 June 2020 – 2 June 2022
- Col. Ariel G. Batungbacal, 2 June 2022 – 26 July 2024
- Col. Kenneth A. Stremmel, 26 July 2024 - 10 July 2024
- Col. Tyson K. Wetzel, 10 July 2026 - Present.

== Decorations ==
- Air and Space Organizational Excellence Award
  - 1 October 1996 – 30 September 1998 (as National Air Intelligence Center)
  - 1 June 2000 – 31 May 2002 (as National Air Intelligence Center)
  - 1 June 2001 – 31 May 2003 (as National Air Intelligence Center)
  - 1 June 2003 – 31 May 2004
  - 1 November 2007 - 31 December 2008
  - 1 January 2013 – 31 December 2014
  - 1 January 2015 – 31 December 2016

== Stations ==
- Wright-Patterson Air Force Base, Dayton, Ohio, 1 July 1961 – present

== See also ==
- Space Delta 18
