= Peter J. Lambert =

U.S. Air Force general

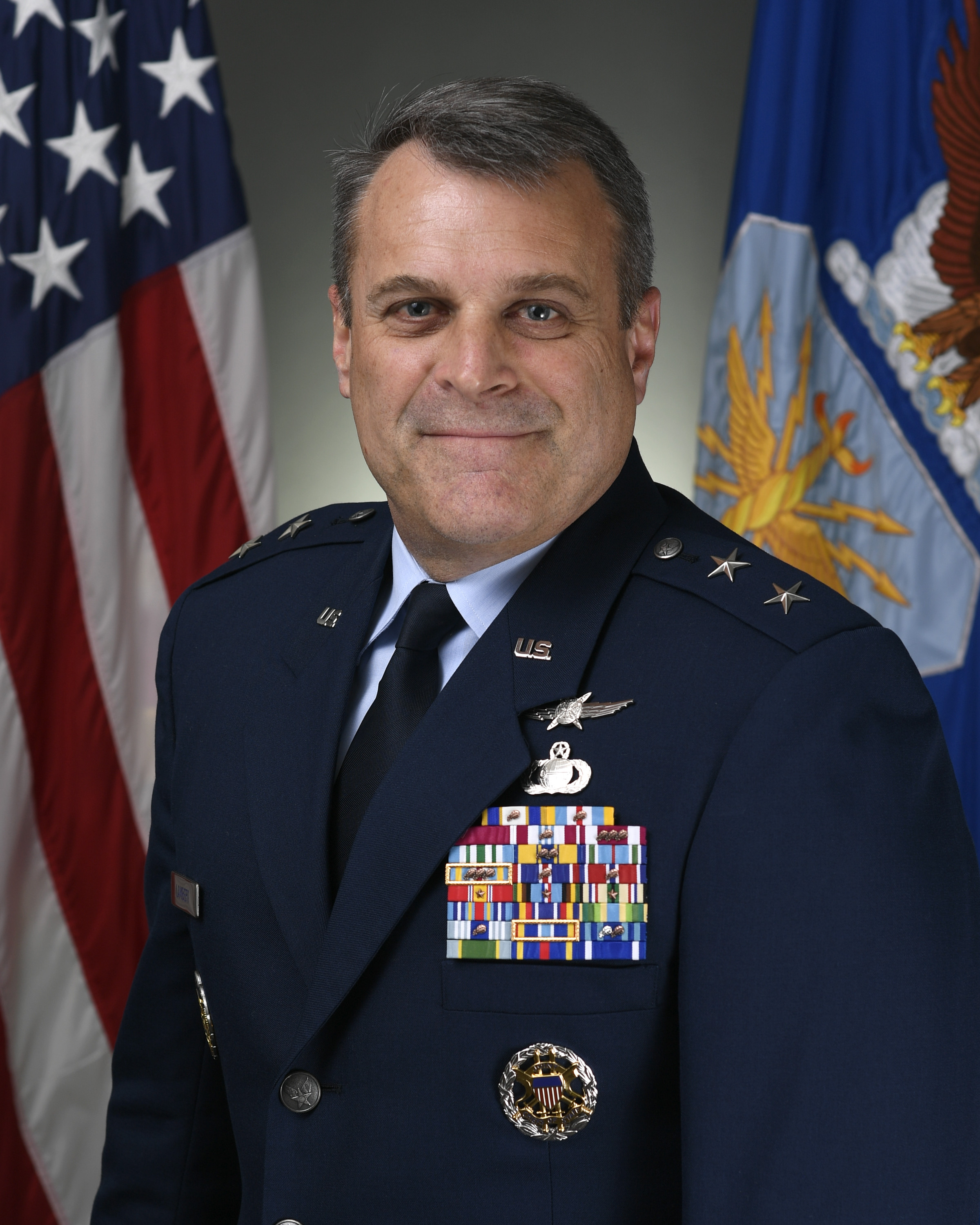
- Military career
- Allegiance: United States
- Branch: United States Air Force
- Service years: 1988–2020 (31 years)
- Rank: Major General
- Commands: National Security Agency-Texas; 659th Intelligence, Surveillance and Reconnaissance Group; 547th Intelligence Squadron
- Awards: Air Force Distinguished Service Medal (3); Defense Superior Service Medal (2); Legion of Merit

Peter J. Lambert is a retired United States Air Force major general who last served as the Assistant Deputy Chief of Staff, Intelligence, Surveillance and Reconnaissance of the U.S. Air Force. Previously, he was the Deputy Director for Intelligence, Surveillance and Reconnaissance Operations of the Joint Staff.

Military offices
Preceded by ???	Vice Commander of the Twenty-Fifth Air Force; 2014–2016	Succeeded by James R. Cluff
Preceded by VeraLinn Jamieson	Director of Intelligence to the Air Combat Command; 2016–2018	Succeeded by Aaron M. Prupas
Preceded by Brett Heimbigner	Deputy Director for Intelligence, Surveillance and Reconnaissance Operations of the Joint Staff; 2018–2019	Succeeded by James R. Cluff
New office	Assistant Deputy Chief of Staff, Intelligence, Surveillance and Reconnaissance of the United States Air Force; 2019–2020	Succeeded by Daniel L. Simpson
