= General Simpson =

General Simpson may refer to:

- Colin Hall Simpson (1894–1964), Australian Army major general
- Daniel L. Simpson (fl. 1990s–2020s), U.S. Air Force major general
- Frank Simpson (British Army officer) (1899–1986), British Army general
- James Simpson (British Army officer) (1792–1868), British Army general
- Noel Simpson (general) (1907–1971), Australian Army major general
- Ormond R. Simpson (1915–1998), U.S. Marine Corps lieutenant general
- William Hood Simpson (1888–1980), United States Army general
