= Space and Missiles Analysis Group =

- Active: 15 April 2008 – present
- Country: United States
- Branch: United States Air Force
- Type: Combat Support
- Role: Intelligence
- Part of: National Air and Space Intelligence Center
- Garrison/HQ: Wright-Patterson AFB, Ohio

The Space and Missiles Analysis Group is a unit of the National Air and Space Intelligence Center that develops space and counterspace threat assessments and assesses foreign land-based ballistic missile systems with ranges of 1,000 kilometers (620 mi) and greater.

== Units ==
- Ballistic Missile Analysis Squadron – Wright-Patterson AFB, Ohio
- Special Analysis Squadron – Wright-Patterson AFB, Ohio

== Major Command ==
- Air Staff (United States), Deputy Chief of Staff for Intelligence, Surveillance, Reconnaissance, and Cyber Effects Operations of the United States Air Force, (1 October 2014 – present)
- Air Force Intelligence, Surveillance and Reconnaissance Agency (2007 – 30 Sep 2014)
- Air Combat Command (2001–2007)
- Air Intelligence Agency (1993–2001)

== List of commanders ==
- Col Kevin Glenn, ~2010
- Col Bradley Hayworth, 19 June 2012
- Col Jay Stewart, ~2016
- Col Katharine Barber, 6 July 2018
