= 1st Space Analysis Squadron =

U.S. Space Force unit

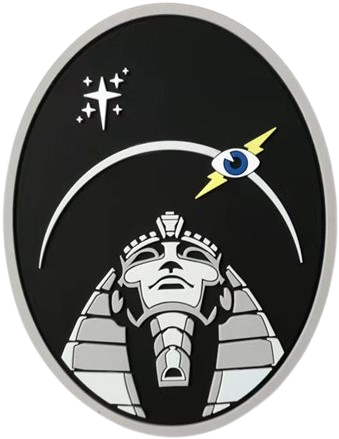
- 1 SAS emblem
- Active: 15 April 2008–present
- Country: United States
- Branch: United States Space Force
- Type: Squadron
- Role: Space intelligence analysis
- Part of: Space Delta 18
- Headquarters: Wright-Patterson Air Force Base, Ohio, U.S.

Insignia
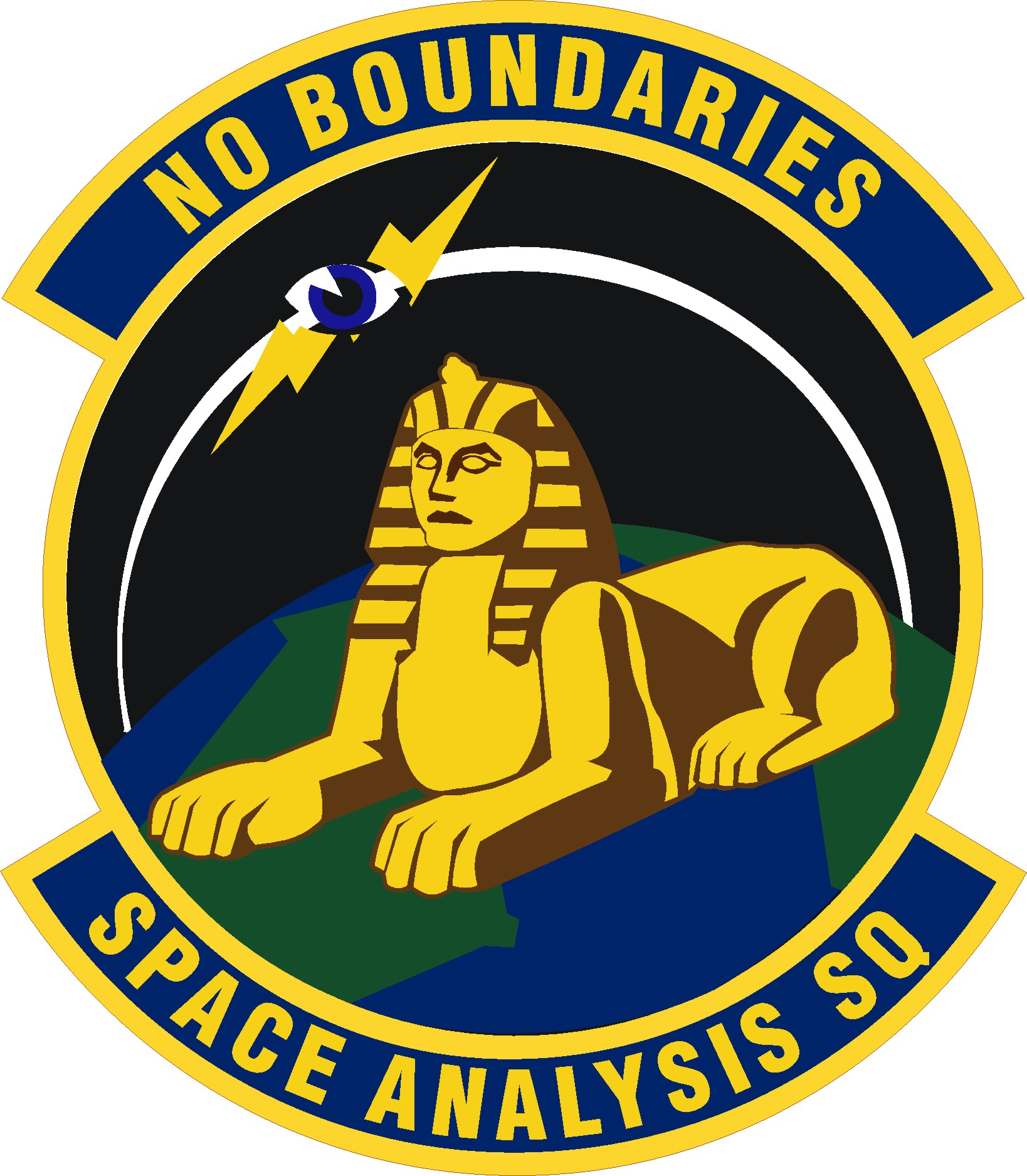
- Space Analysis Squadron emblem: -

The 1st Space Analysis Squadron (1 SAS) is a United States Space Force unit responsible for producing and delivering foundational intelligence on foreign space capabilities supporting the warfighter, acquisitions, and national policy. It was originally activated on 15 April 2008 as the Space Analysis Squadron of the Space and Missiles Analysis Group in the Air Force. It was redesignated as 1 SAS on 24 June 2022 and transferred to the Space Force as part of Space Delta 18.

== See also ==
- Space Delta 18
