= Aaron Prupas =

U.S. Air Force general

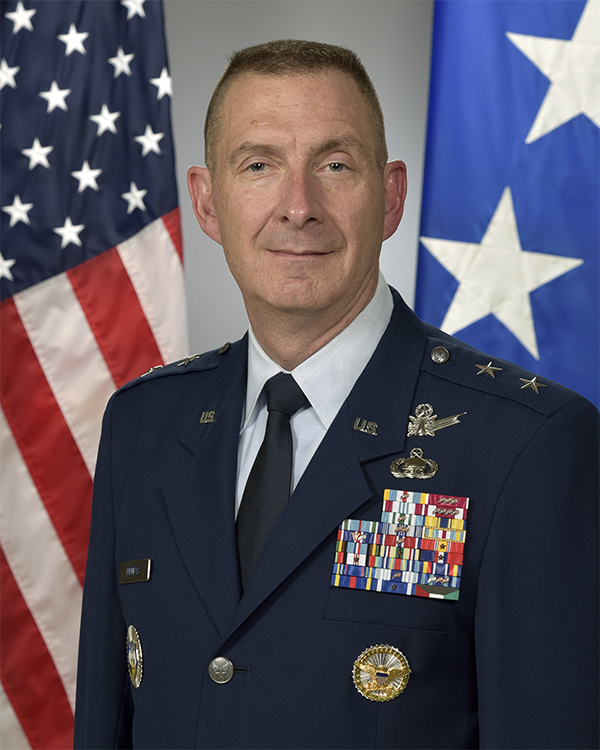
- Military career
- Allegiance: United States
- Branch: United States Air Force
- Service years: 1990–2022
- Rank: Major General
- Commands: National Air and Space Intelligence Center; Air Force Technical Applications Center; 19th Weapons Squadron
- Conflicts: Gulf War; War in Afghanistan
- Awards: Defense Superior Service Medal (2); Legion of Merit (4)

Aaron M. Prupas is a retired United States Air Force major general who served as the director for intelligence and information of the United States Northern Command. Prior to that, he held the same position for the Air Combat Command. In April 2021, he was assigned to become the director of defense intelligence for warfighter support at the Office of the Under Secretary of Defense for Intelligence.

Prupas retired from active duty in 2022.

Military offices
Preceded by Kathleen C. Sakura	Commander of the National Air and Space Intelligence Center; 2012–2014	Succeeded by Leah Lauderback
Preceded by ???	Principal Military Assistant to the Under Secretary of Defense for Intelligence; 2014–2015	Succeeded by James R. Cluff
Preceded by ???	Director of Warfighting Operations Support of the United States Air Force; 2017–2018	Succeeded by James R. Cluff
Preceded by Peter J. Lambert	Director for Intelligence of the Air Combat Command; 2018–2019	Succeeded by Gregory Gagnon
Preceded by Daniel L. Simpson	Director for Intelligence and Information of the United States Northern Command; 2019–2021	Succeeded by Parker H. Wright
