= Leah Lauderback =

U.S. Air Force general

Leah G. Lauderback
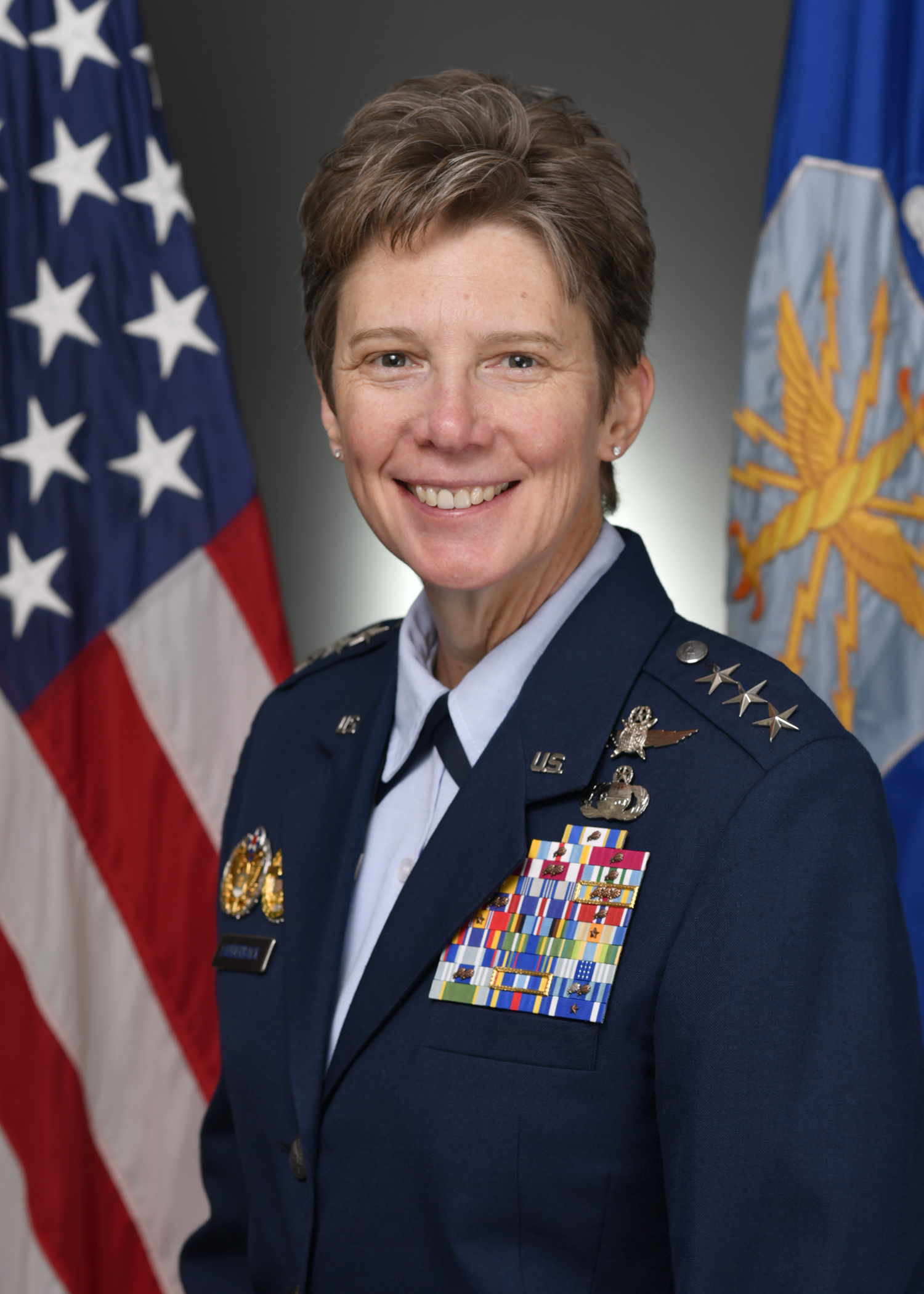
- Official portrait, 2025
- Born: Fairfax, Virginia, U.S.
- Military career
- Allegiance: United States
- Branch: United States Air Force
- Service years: 1993–2025
- Rank: Lieutenant General
- Commands: National Air and Space Intelligence Center; 67th Cyberspace Operations Group; 450th Intelligence Squadron
- Awards: Defense Superior Service Medal (3); Legion of Merit (2)

Leah Gaye Lauderback is a retired United States Air Force lieutenant general who last served as the deputy chief of staff for intelligence, surveillance, reconnaissance, and cyber effects operations of the United States Air Force from 2022 to 2025. She previously served as the director for intelligence, surveillance, and reconnaissance of the United States Space Force from 2020 to 2022. She also served as the director of intelligence of the United States Space Command and director for intelligence, surveillance and reconnaissance operations of the U.S. Air Force.

== Awards and decorations ==
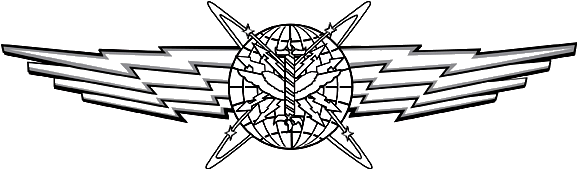

Cyberspace Operator Badge

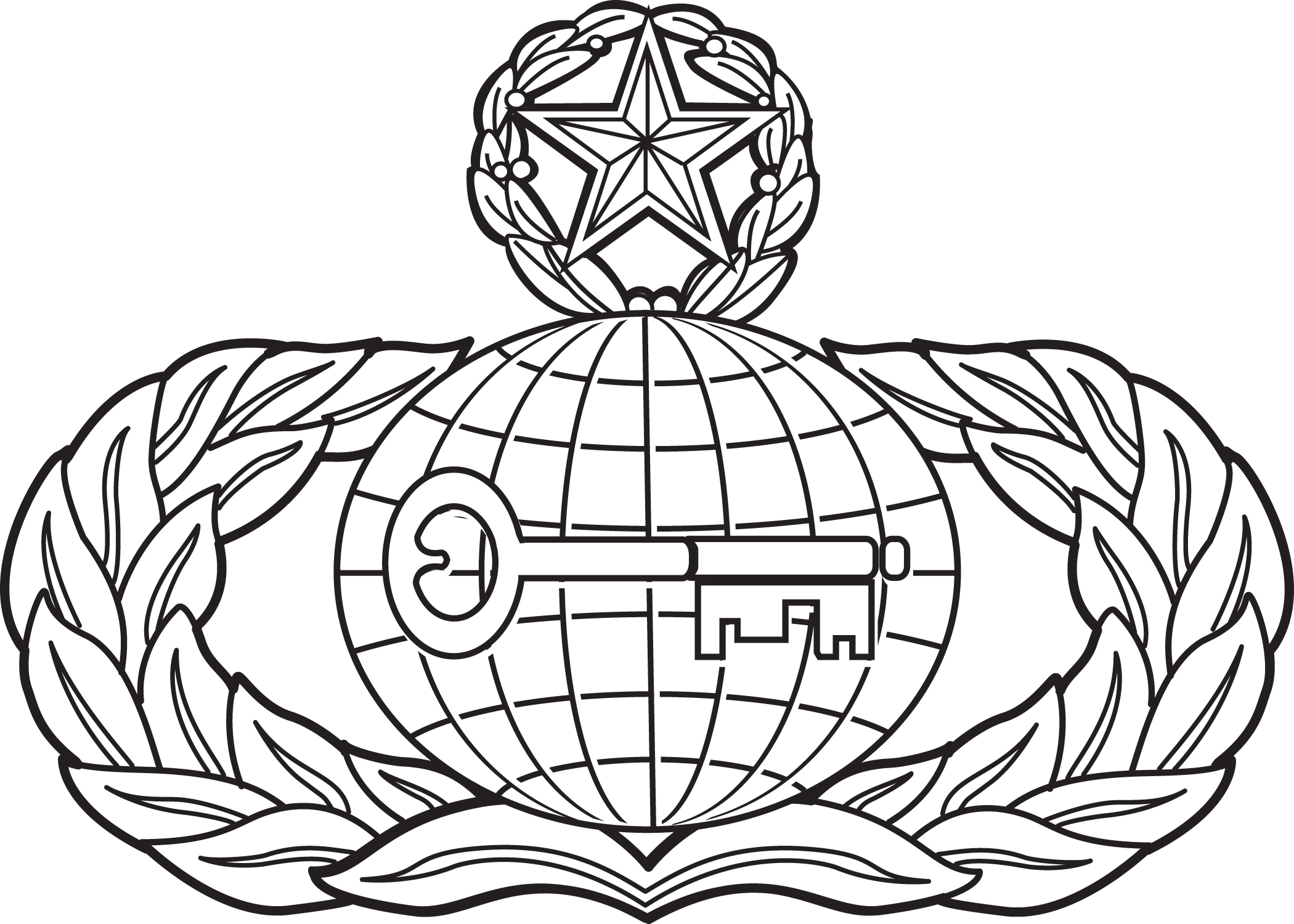

Master Intelligence Badge

Office of the Secretary of Defense Badge

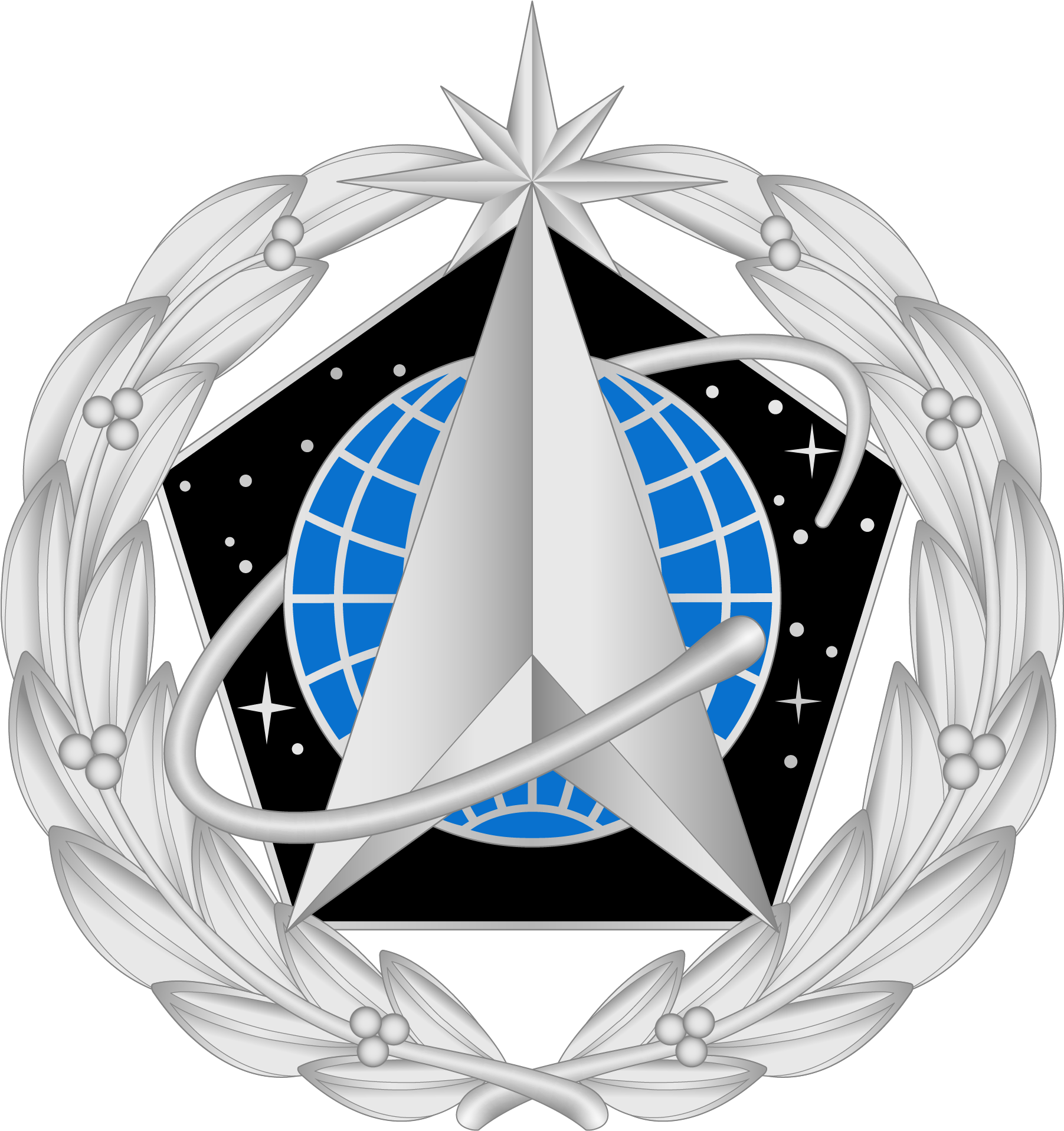

Space Staff Badge

Defense Superior Service Medal
Legion of Merit with oak leaf cluster
Defense Meritorious Service Medal
Meritorious Service Medal with two oak leaf clusters
Air Force Commendation Medal with three oak leaf clusters
Air Force Achievement Medal
Joint Meritorious Unit Award with two oak leaf clusters
Air Force Outstanding Unit Award with three oak leaf clusters
National Defense Service Medal with one bronze service star
Kosovo Campaign Medal with one bronze service star
Global War on Terrorism Service Medal
Korea Defense Service Medal
Armed Forces Service Medal
Air Force Overseas Short Tour Service Ribbon
Air Force Overseas Long Tour Service Ribbon
Air Force Expeditionary Service Ribbon with Gold Border
Air Force Longevity Service Award with one silver oak leaf cluster
Small Arms Expert Marksmanship Ribbon
Air Force Training Ribbon
NATO Medal

Military offices
Preceded by Aaron M. Prupas	Commander of the National Air and Space Intelligence Center; 2014–2016	Succeeded by Sean P. Larkin
Preceded by James R. Cluff	Military Assistant to the Under Secretary of Defense for Intelligence; 2016–2017	Succeeded by Thomas Hensley
Preceded by Karen H. Gibson	Director of Intelligence of Combined Joint Task Force – Operation Inherent Resolve; 2017–2018	Succeeded by Thomas Hensley
Preceded by Michael L. Downs	Director of Intelligence, Surveillance, Reconnaissance and Cyber Effects Operations of the United States Air Force; 2018–2019	Succeeded by Julian Cheater
New office	Director of Intelligence of United States Space Command; 2019–2020	Succeeded by Gregory Gagnon
New office	Director of Intelligence, Surveillance, and Reconnaissance of the United States Space Force; 2020–2022	Succeeded by Gregory Gagnon
Preceded by Mary F. O'Brien	Deputy Chief of Staff for Intelligence, Surveillance, Reconnaissance, and Cyber Effects Operations of the United States Air Force; 2022–2025	Succeeded by Max E. Pearson
