= Bradford Shwedo =

Joint Staff Director for Command, Control, Communications, and Computers/Cyber

Bradford J. Shwedo
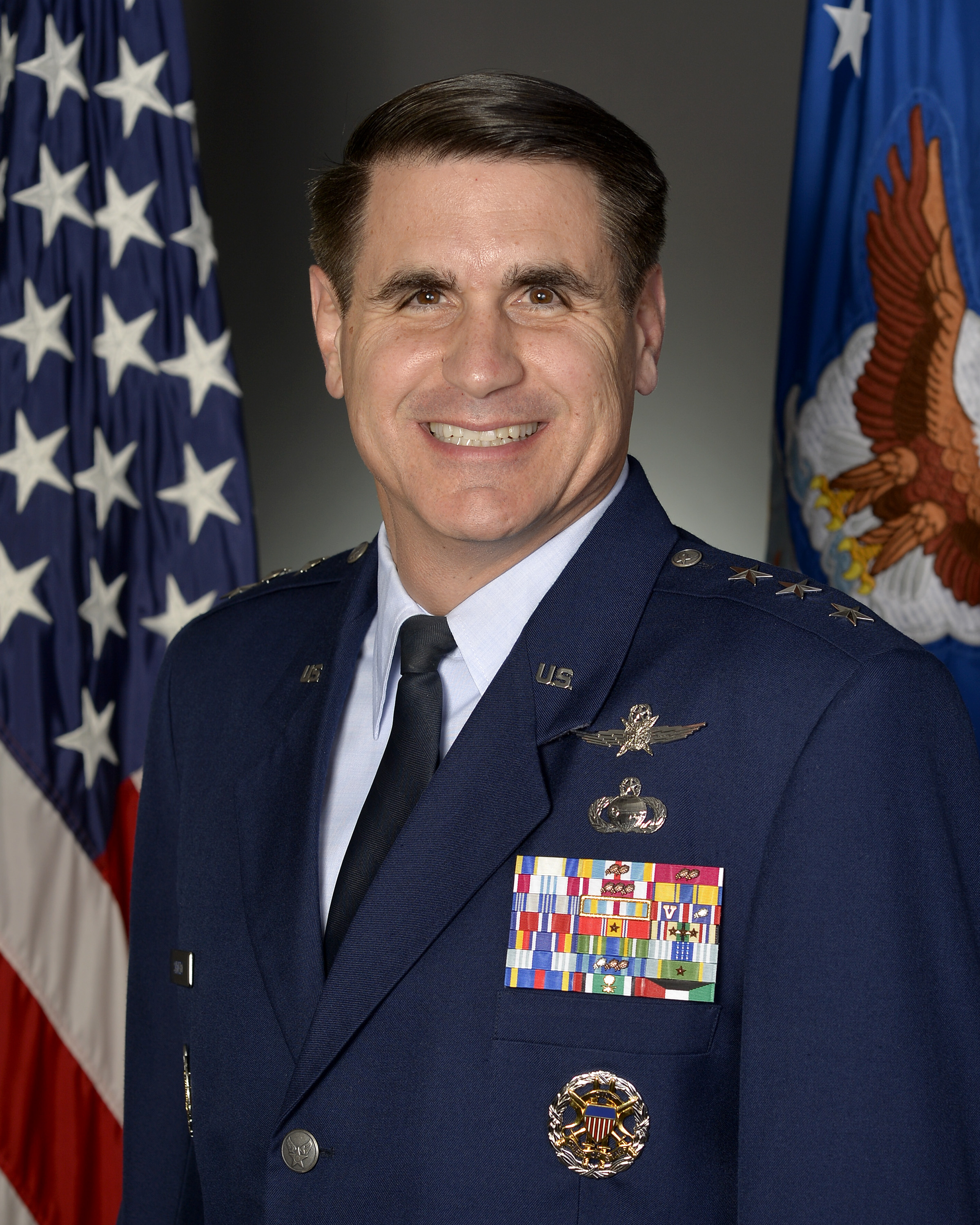
- Military career
- Allegiance: United States
- Branch: United States Air Force
- Service years: 1987–2020
- Rank: Lieutenant General
- Commands: 25th Air Force; 67th Network Warfare Wing; 67th Network Warfare Group
- Conflicts: Gulf War
- Awards: Air Force Distinguished Service Medal; Defense Superior Service Medal (4); Legion of Merit (3)

Bradford James Shwedo is a retired United States Air Force lieutenant general who served as the Director for Command, Control, Communications, and Computers/Cyber and Chief Information Officer of the Joint Staff. Prior to that, he was the Chief of Information Dominance and Chief Information Officer of the Office of the Secretary of the Air Force. He now serves as the first director of the United States Air Force Academy's Institute of Future Conflict.

Military offices
Preceded by ???	Commander of the 67th Network Warfare Wing; 2008–2010	Succeeded by Kevin B. Wooton
Preceded by ???	Director of Intelligence of the Air Combat Command; 2011–2013	Succeeded by VeraLinn Jamieson
Preceded by Linda R. Medler	Director of Capability and Resource Integration of the United States Cyber Command; 2013–2015	Succeeded by Kenneth D. Hubbard
Preceded by John N.T. Shanahan	Commander of the Twenty-Fifth Air Force; 2015–2017	Succeeded by Mary F. O'Brien
Preceded by William J. Bender	Chief of Information Dominance and Chief Information Officer of the United States Air Force; 2017–2018	Succeeded by ???
Preceded by Marshall B. Lytle	Director of Command, Control, Communications, and Computers/Cyber and Chief Information Officer of the Joint Staff; 2018–2020	Succeeded by Dennis Crall
