= Deputy Chief of Staff for Intelligence of the United States Air Force =

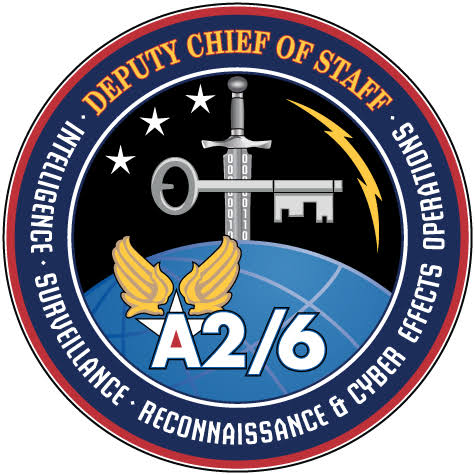

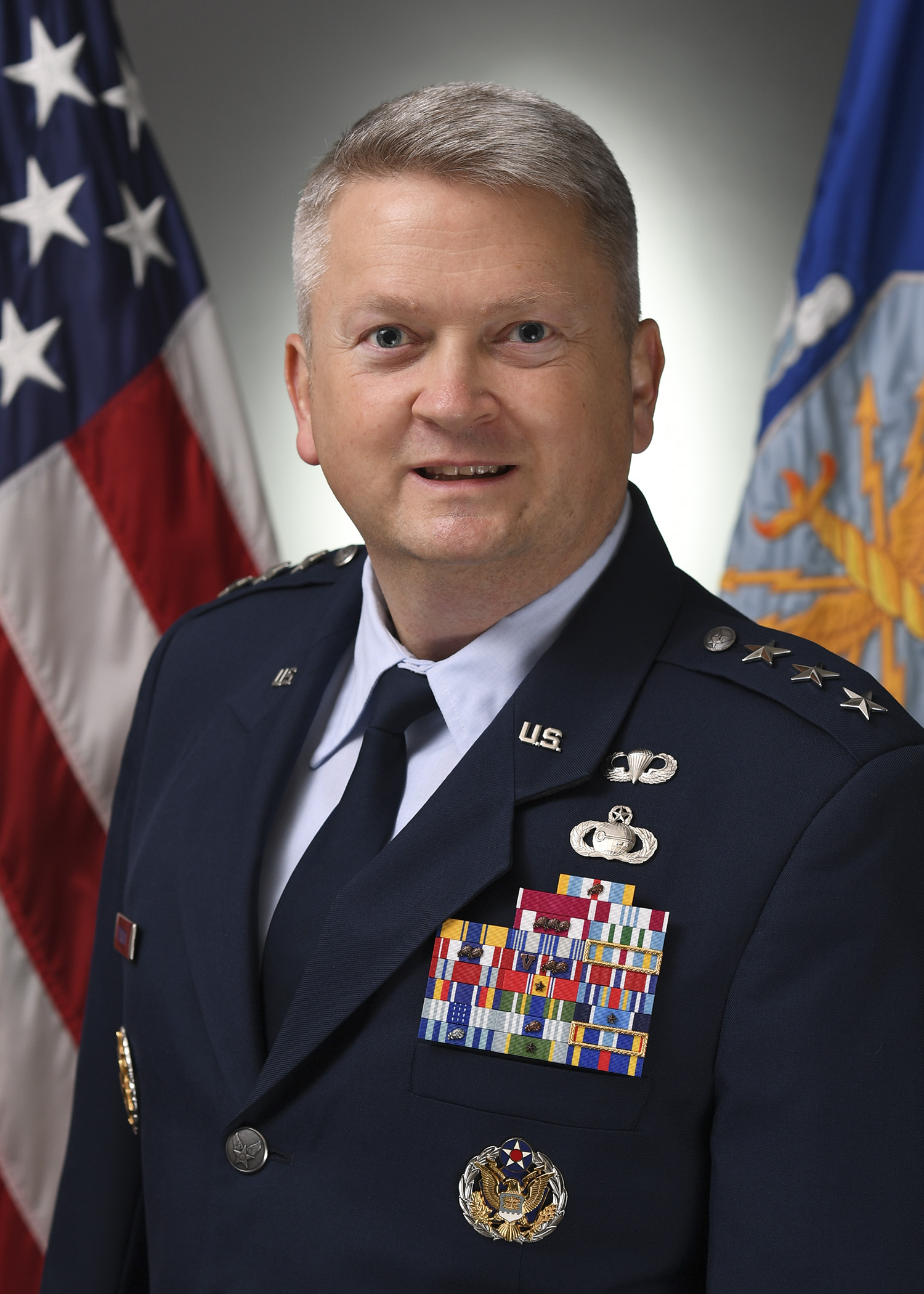
- Incumbent; Lieutenant General Max E. Pearson since 12 August 2025
- United States Air Force
- Abbreviation: A2/6
- Member of: Air Staff
- Reports to: Secretary of the Air Force; Chief of Staff of the United States Air Force
- Appointer: The president; with Senate advice and consent
- Formation: 1 July 1957
- First holder: Millard Lewis
- Deputy: Assistant Deputy Chief of Staff for Intelligence of the United States Air Force

The deputy chief of staff for intelligence of the United States Air Force is a position in the United States Air Force tasked with the development and implementation of policy formulation, planning, evaluation, oversight and leadership of Air Force intelligence capabilities. Commonly referred to as the A2, it is held by a lieutenant general who also serves as the representative of the Air Force to the intelligence community. The position is one of among the ten same positions in the headquarters of the U.S. Air Force. As such, the officeholder of this position serves in the Air Staff. The current holder of this position is Lieutenant General Max E. Pearson.

== Organization ==
- Deputy Chief of Staff for Intelligence, Surveillance, Reconnaissance and Cyber Effects Operations: Lt Gen Leah G. Lauderback
  - Assistant Deputy Chief of Staff for Intelligence, Surveillance and Reconnaissance: Maj Gen Daniel L. Simpson
    - Director of Remotely Piloted Aircraft and Airborne ISR Capabilities: Brig Gen Stewart A. Hammons
    - Director of Intelligence, Surveillance, and Reconnaissance Operations: Brig Gen Max E. Pearson
  - Assistant Deputy Chief of Staff for Cyber Effects Operations: Maj Gen David W. Snoddy
    - Director of Cyberspace Operations and Warfighter Communications:
    - Director of Electromagnetic Spectrum Superiority:

== List of deputy chiefs of staff for intelligence, surveillance, reconnaissance, and cyber effects operations of the United States Air Force ==
| No. | Deputy Chief of Staff | | Term | | | Ref. |
| No. | Portrait | Name | Took office | Left office | Term length | Ref. |
Assistant Chief of Staff for Intelligence
| 1 | Millard Lewis | Major General; Millard Lewis | 1 July 1957 | 4 May 1958 | 307 days | |
| 2 | James H. Walsh | Major General; James H. Walsh | 5 May 1958 | 16 July 1961 | 3 years, 72 days | |
| 3 | Robert A. Breitweiser | Major General; Robert A. Breitweiser | 17 July 1961 | 14 March 1963 | 1 year, 240 days | |
| 4 | Jack E. Thomas | Major General; Jack E. Thomas | 15 March 1963 | 30 April 1969 | 6 years, 46 days | |
| 5 | Jamie M. Philpott | Major General; Jamie M. Philpott | 1 May 1969 | 31 October 1969 | 183 days | |
| – | Rockly Triantafellu | Major General; Rockly Triantafellu; Acting | 1 November 1969 | 10 November 1969 | 9 days | |
| 6 | Rockly Triantafellu | Major General; Rockly Triantafellu | 11 November 1969 | 29 February 1972 | 2 years, 110 days | |
| 7 | George J. Keegan Jr. | Major General; George J. Keegan Jr. | 1 March 1972 | 31 December 1976 | 4 years, 305 days | |
| 8 | Eugene R. Tighe Jr. | Major General; Eugene R. Tighe Jr. | 1 January 1977 | 31 August 1977 | 242 days | |
| 9 | James L. Brown | Major General; James L. Brown | 15 August 1977 | 13 April 1980 | 2 years, 242 days | |
| 10 | John B. Marks | Major General; John B. Marks | 10 April 1980 | 31 July 1983 | 3 years, 112 days | |
| 11 | James C. Pfautz | Major General; James C. Pfautz | 1 August 1983 | 30 April 1985 | 1 year, 272 days | |
| 12 | Leonard H. Perroots | Major General; Leonard H. Perroots | 1 May 1985 | 30 September 1985 | 152 days | |
| 13 | Schuyler Bissell | Major General; Schuyler Bissell | 1 October 1985 | 30 April 1988 | 2 years, 212 days | |
| 14 | C. Norman Wood | Major General; C. Norman Wood | 2 May 1988 | 31 March 1990 | 1 year, 333 days | |
| 15 | James R. Clapper | Major General; James R. Clapper | 1 April 1990 | 2 September 1991 | 1 year, 154 days | |
| 16 | Richard O'Lear | Major General; Richard O'Lear | 3 September 1991 | 24 May 1993 | 1 year, 263 days | |
| 17 | Ervin J. Rokke | Major General; Ervin J. Rokke | 25 May 1993 | 25 September 1994 | 1 year, 123 days | |
| 18 | Kenneth A. Minihan | Major General; Kenneth A. Minihan | 11 October 1994 | 31 August 1995 | 324 days | |
| 19 | A. Bowen Ballard | Major General; A. Bowen Ballard | 1 September 1995 | 31 December 1996 | 1 year, 15 days | |
| 20 | John P. Casciano | Major General; John P. Casciano | 16 December 1995 | 31 December 1996 | ~3 years, 75 days | |
Director of Intelligence, Surveillance, and Reconnaissance
| 21 | John P. Casciano | Major General; John P. Casciano | 1 January 1997 | March 1999 | ~2 years, 59 days | |
| 22 | Glen D. Shaffer | Major General; Glen D. Shaffer | March 1999 | July 2002 | ~3 years, 122 days | |
| 23 | Ronald F. Sams | Major General; Ronald F. Sams | July 2002 | March 2006 | ~3 years, 243 days | |
| – | Kevin J. Kennedy | Major General; Kevin J. Kennedy; Acting | March 2006 | July 2006 | ~122 days | |
Deputy Chief of Staff for Intelligence, Surveillance, and Reconnaissance
| 24 | David A. Deptula | Lieutenant General; David A. Deptula | July 2006 | 1 October 2010 | ~4 years, 92 days | |
| 25 | Larry D. James | Lieutenant General; Larry D. James | 1 October 2010 | June 2013 | ~2 years, 243 days | |
| 26 | Robert P. Otto | Lieutenant General; Robert P. Otto | June 2013 | November 2016 | ~3 years, 153 days | |
| 27 | VeraLinn Jamieson | Lieutenant General; VeraLinn Jamieson | November 2016 | February 2019 | ~2 years, 92 days | |
Deputy Chief of Staff for Intelligence, Surveillance, Reconnaissance, and Cyber Effects Operations
| 27 | VeraLinn Jamieson | Lieutenant General; VeraLinn Jamieson | February 2019 | 8 November 2019 | ~280 days | |
| 28 | Mary F. O'Brien | Lieutenant General; Mary F. O'Brien | 8 November 2019 | 5 August 2022 | 2 years, 270 days | |
| 29 | Leah Lauderback | Lieutenant General; Leah Lauderback | 5 August 2022 | 12 August 2025 | 3 years, 7 days | |
Deputy Chief of Staff for Intelligence
| 30 | Max E. Pearson | Lieutenant General; Max E. Pearson | 12 August 2025 | Incumbent | 1 year, 68 days | |

== See also ==
- Air Staff
- Deputy Chief of Staff for Operations of the United States Air Force
- United States Air Force
