= John N.T. Shanahan =

Retired U.S. Air Force general

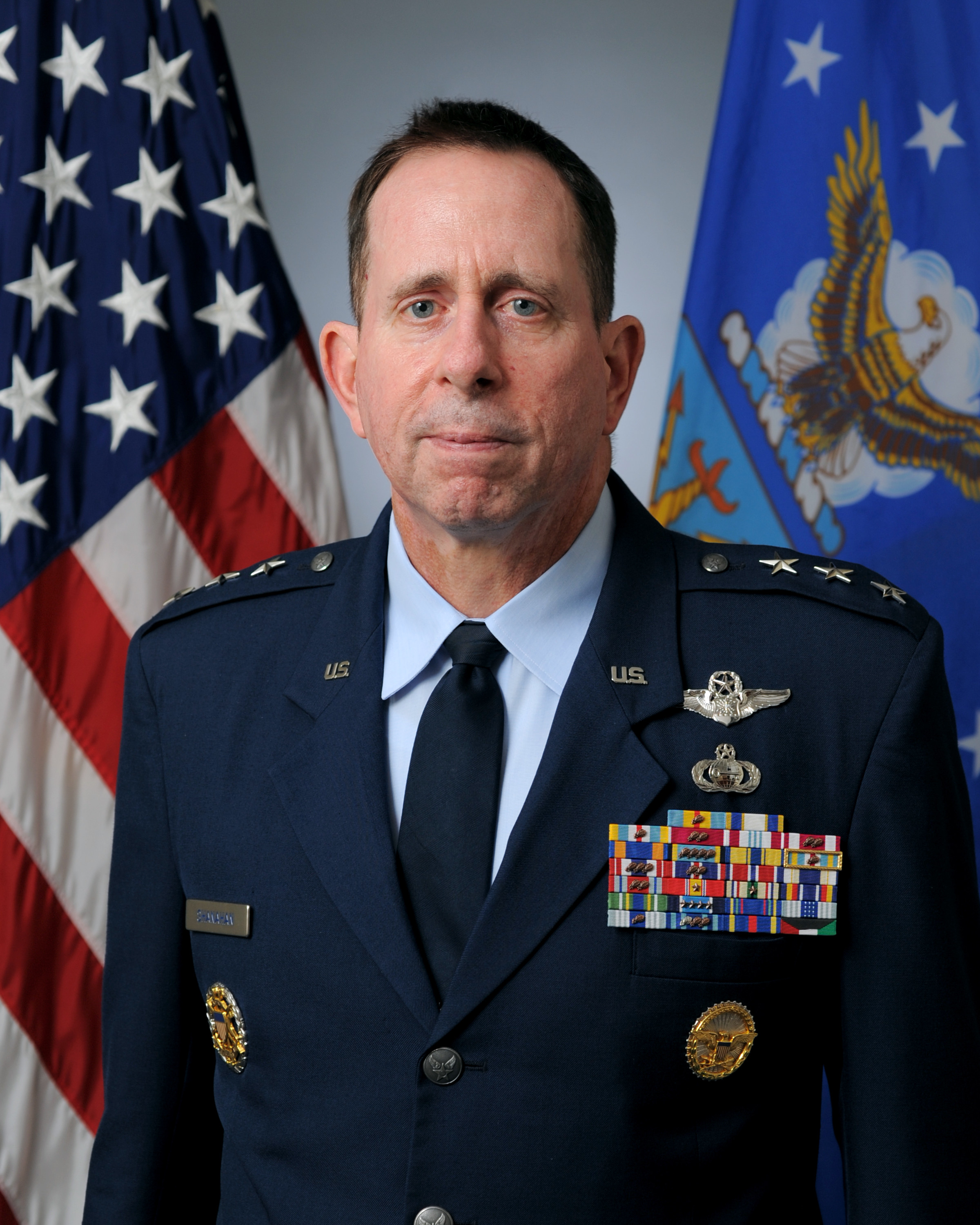
- Official portrait, 2020
- Military career
- Allegiance: United States
- Branch: United States Air Force
- Service years: 1984–2020
- Rank: Lieutenant General
- Commands: Joint Artificial Intelligence Center; Twenty-Fifth Air Force; Air Force Intelligence, Surveillance and Reconnaissance Agency; 55th Wing; 505th Command and Control Wing; 480th Intelligence Group
- Awards: Defense Distinguished Service Medal (2); Air Force Distinguished Service Medal; Defense Superior Service Medal (2); Legion of Merit (2)

John N.T. "Jack" Shanahan is a retired United States Air Force lieutenant general who last served as the first director of the Joint Artificial Intelligence Center. Prior to that, he was the Director of Defense Intelligence for Warfighter Support of the Office of the Undersecretary of Defense for Intelligence. Shanahan graduated from the University of Michigan in 1984 with a B.S. degree in chemistry. He later earned an M.A. degree in national security and strategic studies from the College of Naval Command and Staff at the Naval War College in 1996 and an M.S. degree in national security strategy from the National War College in 2001.

Military offices
Preceded by ???	Commander of the 505th Command and Control Wing; 2007–2009	Succeeded by Edward McKinzie
Preceded by James J. Jones	Commander of the 55th Wing; 2009–2011	Succeeded by Donald J. Bacon
Preceded by Rowayne A. Schatz	Deputy Director of Global Operations of the Joint Staff; 2011–2013	Succeeded by David Béen
Preceded by Robert P. Otto	Commander of the Air Force Intelligence, Surveillance and Reconnaissance Agency; 2013–2014	Command inactivated
New office	Commander of the Twenty-Fifth Air Force; 2014–2015	Succeeded by Bradford J. Shwedo
Preceded by Raymond P. Palumbo	Director of Defense Intelligence for Warfighter Support of the Office of the Undersecretary of Defense for Intelligence; 2015–2018	Succeeded by Jeffrey A. Kruse
New office	Director of the Joint Artificial Intelligence Center; 2018–2020	Succeeded by Nand Mulchandani; Acting
