= Mary F. O'Brien =

U.S. Air Force Lieutenant general

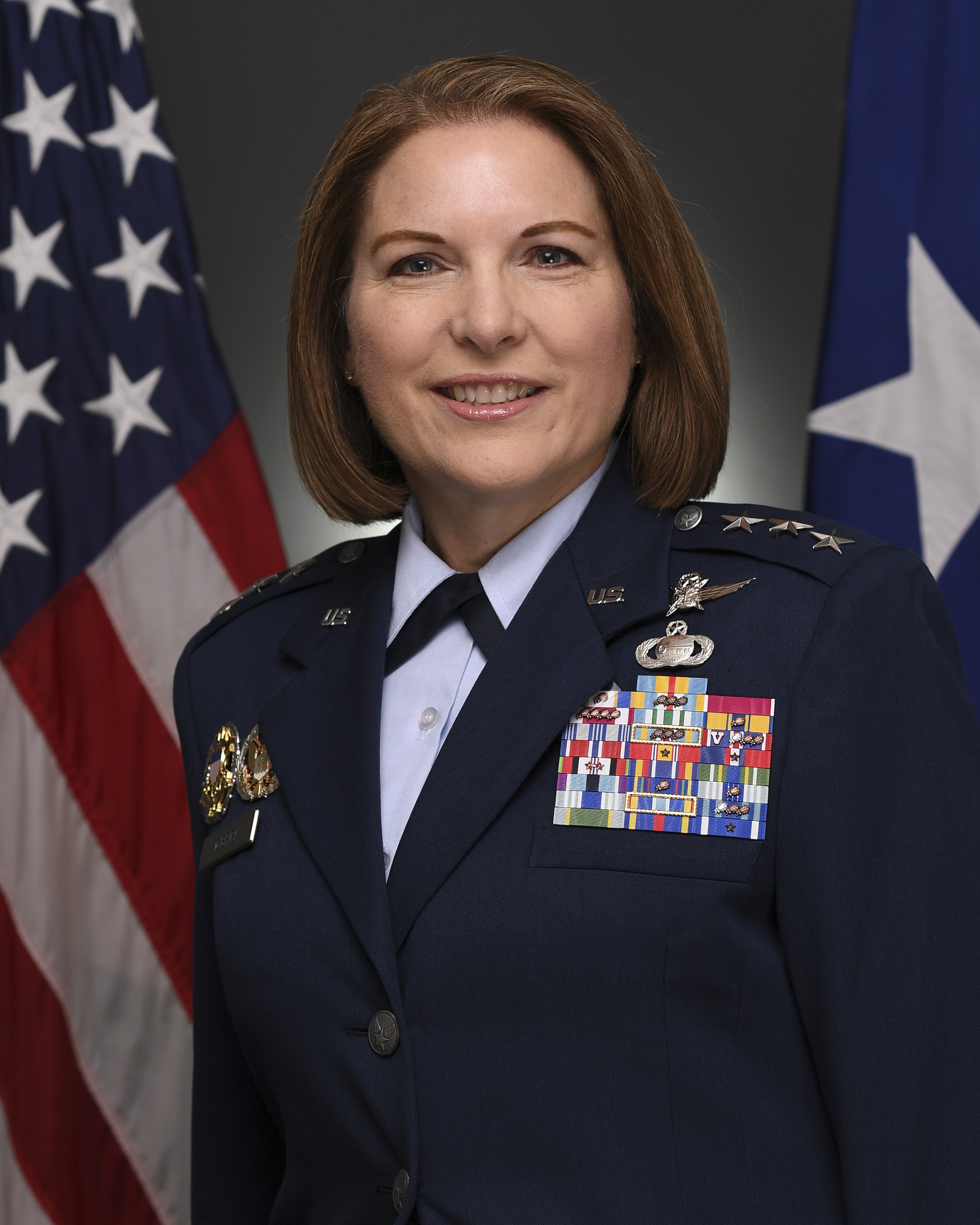
- Military career
- Allegiance: United States
- Branch: United States Air Force
- Service years: 1989–2023
- Rank: Lieutenant General
- Commands: Twenty-Fifth Air Force; 70th Intelligence, Surveillance and Reconnaissance Wing; 691st Intelligence, Surveillance and Reconnaissance Group; 22nd Intelligence Squadron
- Conflicts: War in Afghanistan
- Awards: Defense Distinguished Service Medal; Air Force Distinguished Service Medal; Defense Superior Service Medal (4); Legion of Merit

Mary F. O'Brien is a retired United States Air Force lieutenant general who served as the director for command, control, communications, and computers/cyber and chief information officer of the Joint Staff from 2022 to 2023. She previously served as the Deputy Chief of Staff for Intelligence, Surveillance, Reconnaissance and Cyber Effects Operations from 2019 to 2022. Prior to serving in that position, O'Brien commanded the Twenty-Fifth Air Force.

O'Brien is from Bloomfield Hills, Michigan and graduated from the United States Air Force Academy in 1989 with a Bachelor of Science in chemistry. In April 2022, O'Brien was nominated for appointment as director of command, control, communications, and computers/cyber and chief information officer of the Joint Staff.

== Effective dates of promotions ==
Rank	Date
Second Lieutenant	May 31, 1989
First Lieutenant	May 31, 1991
Captain	May 31, 1993
Major	July 1, 1999
Lieutenant Colonel	March 1, 2002
Colonel	August 1, 2007
Brigadier General	May 2, 2014
Major General	August 2, 2017
Lieutenant General	November 8, 2019

Military offices
Preceded by John D. Bansemer	Commander of the 70th Intelligence, Surveillance and Reconnaissance Wing; 2011–2013	Succeeded by Kevin D. Dixon
Preceded by James R. Marrs	Director for Intelligence of the United States Cyber Command; 2015–2017	Succeeded by Timothy D. Haugh
Preceded by Bradford J. Shwedo	Commander of the 25th Air Force; 2017–2019	Succeeded by Timothy D. Haugh
Preceded by VeraLinn Jamieson	Deputy Chief of Staff for Intelligence, Surveillance, Reconnaissance, and Cyber Effects Operations of the United States Air Force; 2019–2022	Succeeded by Leah G. Lauderback
Preceded by Dennis Crall	Director for Command, Control, Communications, and Computers/Cyber and Chief Information Officer of the Joint Staff; 2022–2023	Succeeded by David T. Isaacson
