= VeraLinn Jamieson =

Retired US Air Force general (born 1960)

VeraLinn 'Dash' Jamieson
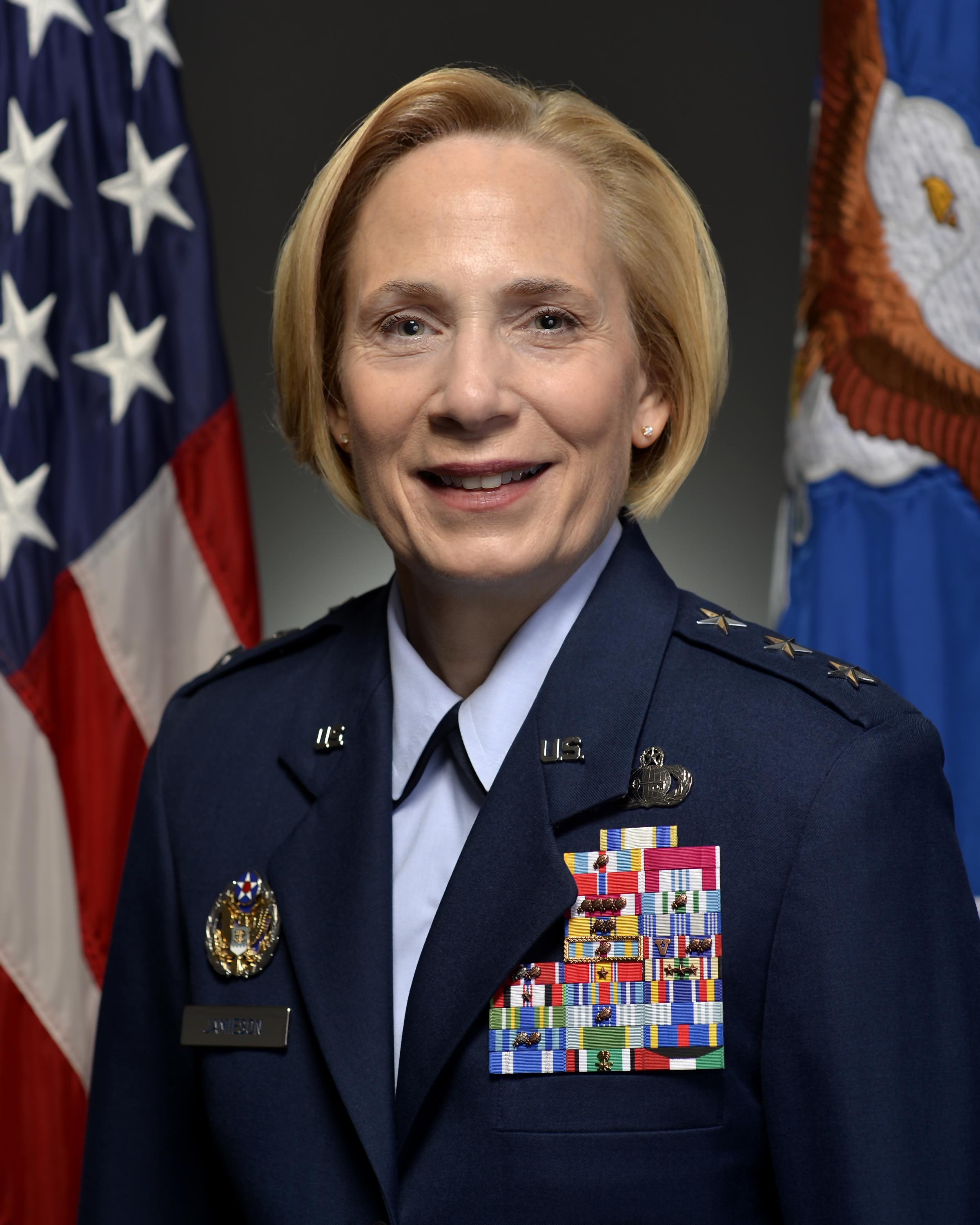
- Born: 1960 (age 65–66)
- Military career
- Allegiance: United States
- Branch: United States Air Force
- Service years: 1982–2020
- Rank: Lieutenant General
- Nickname: Dash
- Commands: Deputy Chief of Staff for Intelligence, Surveillance and Reconnaissance (A2)

VeraLinn Jamieson (born 1960) is a retired United States Air Force lieutenant general. She last served as the Deputy Chief of Staff for Intelligence, Surveillance and Reconnaissance, a position she held from 2016 to 2020.

Military offices
Preceded by Bradford J. Shwedo	Director of Intelligence of the Air Combat Command; 2013–2016	Succeeded by Peter J. Lambert
Preceded by Mark W. Westergren	Deputy Commander of the Joint Functional Component Command for Intelligence, Surveillance and Reconnaissance; 2016	Succeeded by Brett C. Heimbigner
Preceded by Robert P. Otto	Deputy Chief of Staff for Intelligence, Surveillance, Reconnaissance, and Cyber Effects Operations of the United States Air Force; 2016–2019	Succeeded by Mary F. O’Brien
