= Dennis Crall =

U.S. Marine Corps general

Dennis A. Crall
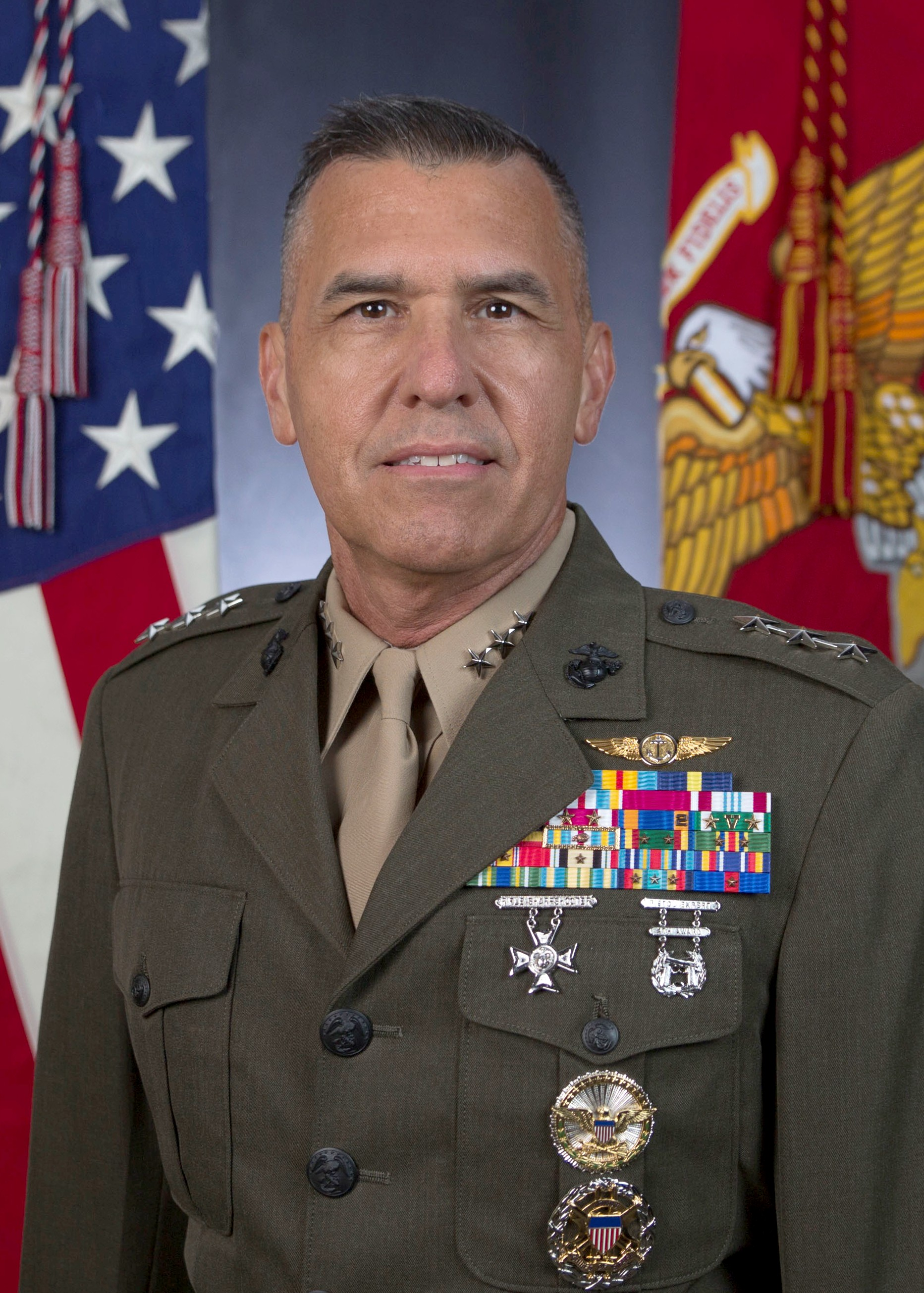
- Official portrait, 2022
- Born: c. 1965 (age 60–61); South Carolina, U.S.
- Military career
- Allegiance: United States
- Branch: United States Marine Corps
- Service years: 1987–2022
- Rank: Lieutenant General
- Conflicts: Iraq War
- Awards: Defense Distinguished Service Medal; Defense Superior Service Medal; Legion of Merit

Dennis A. Crall (born c. 1965) is a retired United States Marine Corps lieutenant general who last served as the director for command, control, communications, and computers/cyber and chief information officer of the Joint Staff. He previously was the senior military advisor for cyber policy to the Under Secretary of Defense for Policy.

Military offices
Preceded by ???	Director of Command, Control, Communications, and Computers and Chief Information Officer of the United States Marine Corps; 2015–2018	Succeeded by Lorna Mahlock
Preceded by B. Edwin Wilson	Senior Military Advisor for Cyber Policy to the Under Secretary of Defense for Policy; 2018–2020	Succeeded by William Chase III
Preceded by Bradford J. Shwedo	Director for Command, Control, Communications, and Computers/Cyber and Chief Information Officer of the Joint Staff; 2020–2022	Succeeded by Mary F. O'Brien
