= Max E. Pearson =

Lt. Gen. Max “Harpo” Pearson serves as the deputy chief of staff for intelligence. He is responsible to the secretary and chief of staff of the Air Force for policy formulation, planning, evaluation, oversight and leadership of the Air Force's Intelligence operations. As the Air Force's Senior Intelligence Officer, he is directly responsible to the director of national intelligence and the under secretary of defense for intelligence and security. He leads four directorates and supports a 36,000-person enterprise with a portfolio valued at $35 billion across the Air Force.

Lt. Gen. Pearson earned his commission as a graduate of the United States Air Force Academy in 1998. He has operational experience in the Indo-Pacific Command, Central Command, and European Command areas of responsibility. He has commanded at the squadron and wing levels. His staff assignments include tours at the Office of the Secretary of Defense, Office of the Director of National Intelligence, Air Staff and Joint Staff. Prior to his current position, he served as the deputy director of Operations for Combat Support at the National Security Agency.
