= Daniel L. Simpson =

U.S. Air Force general

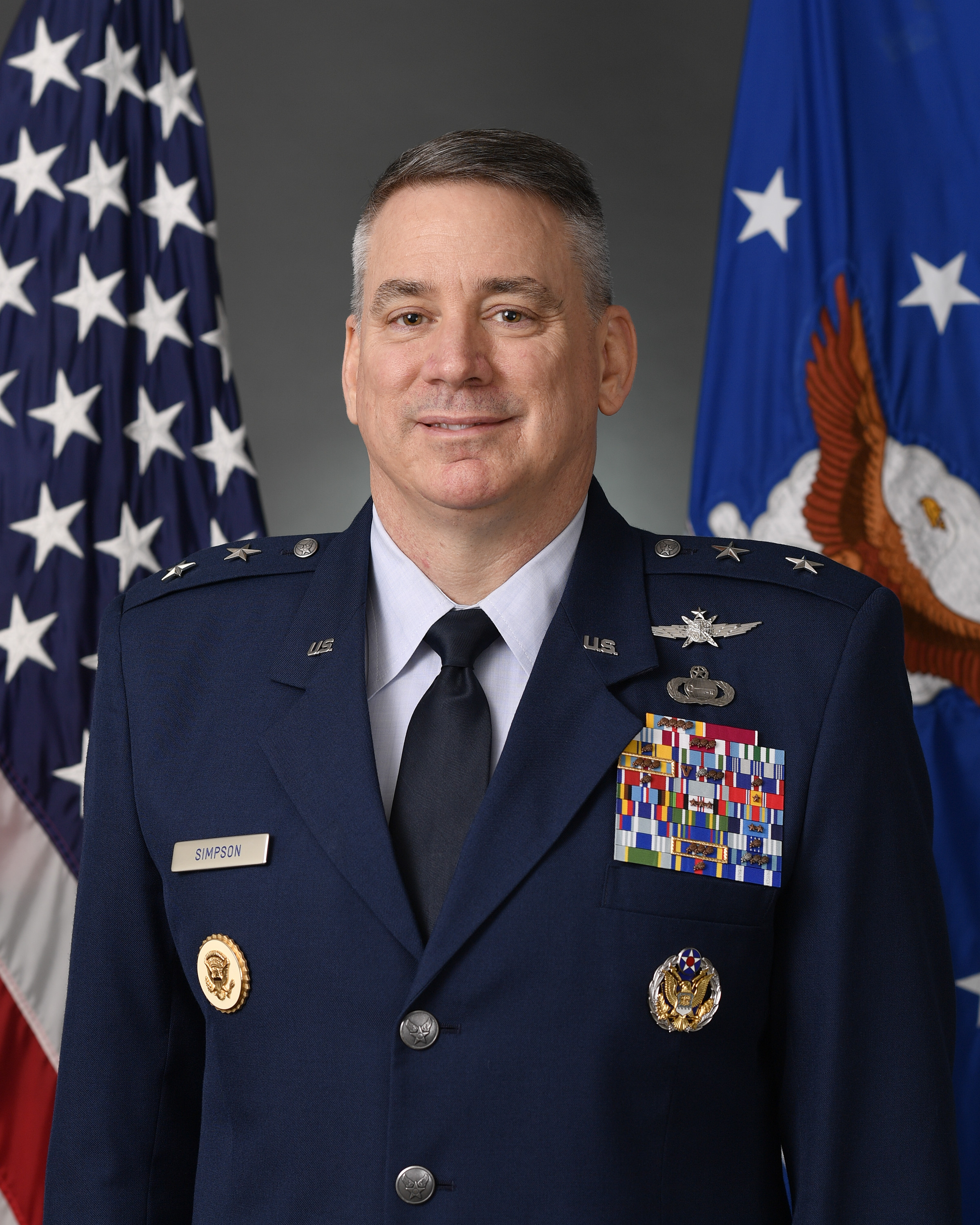
- Born: Reno, Nevada, U.S.
- Military career
- Allegiance: United States
- Branch: United States Air Force
- Service years: 1992–2023
- Rank: Major General
- Commands: National Security Agency Texas; 659th Intelligence, Surveillance, and Reconnaissance Group; 31st Intelligence Squadron; 480th Intelligence, Surveillance, and Reconnaissance Group (Provisional)
- Conflicts: War in Afghanistan
- Awards: Defense Superior Service Medal (5); Legion of Merit

Daniel Lawrence Simpson is a United States Air Force major general who last served as the Assistant Deputy Chief of Staff for Intelligence, Surveillance and Reconnaissance. Previously, he was the Director of Intelligence of the United States Forces Afghanistan.

Military offices
| Preceded by Brad M. Sullivan | Director of Intelligence and Information of the United States Northern Command; 2017–2019 | Succeeded by Aaron M. Prupas |
| Preceded by Anthony R. Hale | Director of Intelligence of the U.S. Forces Afghanistan; 2019–2020 | Succeeded by Michelle A. Schmidt |
| Preceded by Peter J. Lambert | Assistant Deputy Chief of Staff for Intelligence, Surveillance and Reconnaissance of the United States Air Force; 2020–2023 | Vacant |
