= Twenty-Fifth Air Force =

Defunct subdivision of the United States Air Force

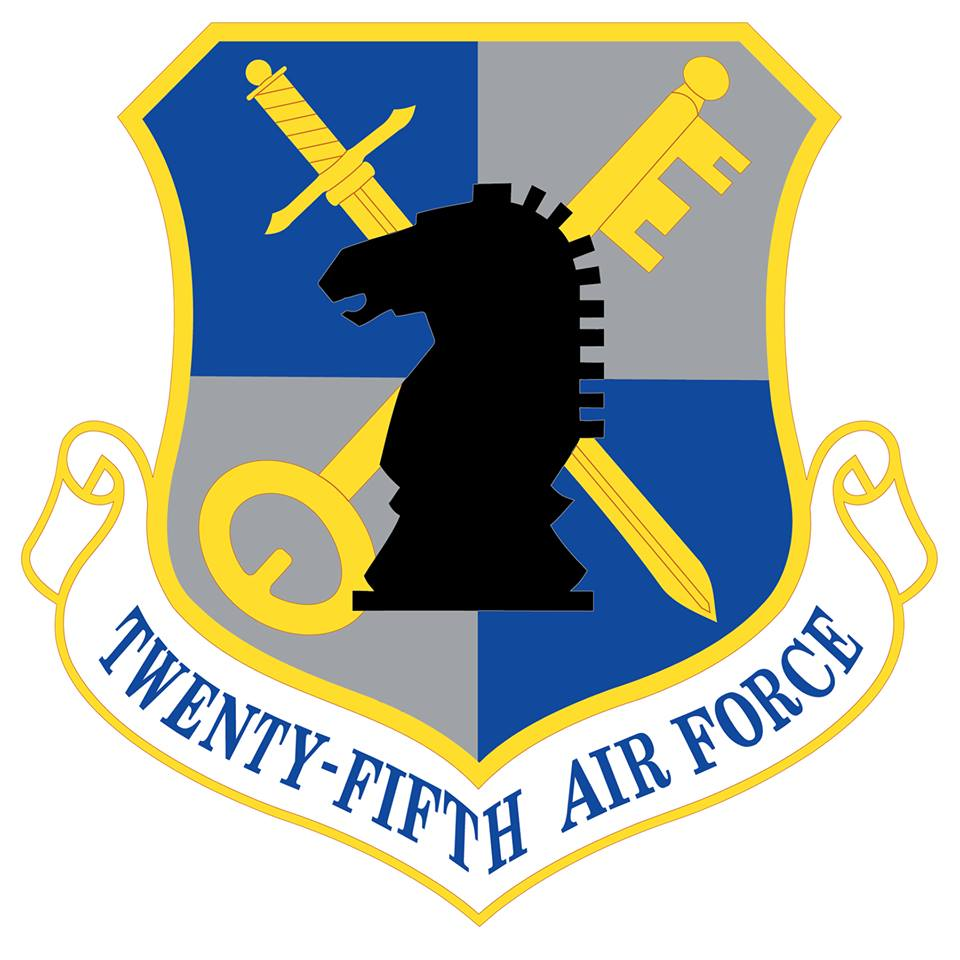
- Shield of the Twenty-Fifth Air Force
- Active: 29 September 2014 – 11 October 2019 (as Twenty-Fifth Air Force); 8 June 2007 – 29 September 2014 (as Air Force Intelligence, Surveillance, and Reconnaissance Agency); 1 October 1993 – 8 June 2007 (as Air Intelligence Agency); 1 October 1991 – 1 October 1993 (as Air Force Intelligence Command); 1 August 1979 – 1 October 1991 (as Electronic Security Command); 20 October 1948 – 1 August 1979 (as United States Air Force Security Service) (77 years, 7 months)
- Country: United States of America
- Branch: United States Air Force
- Type: Numbered Air Force
- Role: Provide Air Combat Command and the Air Force with accurate and timely Intelligence, Surveillance, and Reconnaissance
- Part of: Air Combat Command
- Headquarters: Lackland Air Force Base, Joint Base San Antonio, Texas, U.S.
- Motto: Freedom Through Vigilance
- Decorations: Air Force Organizational Excellence Award

Commanders
- Notable commanders: Major General Timothy D. Haugh (Final Commander)

Twenty-Fifth Air Force (25 AF), was a numbered air force (NAF) within the United States Air Force (USAF), and served as the Air Force's premier military intelligence organization. 25 AF was established on 29 September 2014 by redesignating the Air Force Intelligence, Surveillance and Reconnaissance Agency (a field operating agency) under Headquarters, United States Air Force, to a numbered air force aligned under Air Combat Command. The USAF also realigned the 9th Reconnaissance Wing and the 55th Wing under the new NAF. It was headquartered at Lackland Air Force Base, Texas.

Its primary mission was to provide intelligence, surveillance and reconnaissance (ISR) products, applications, capabilities and resources, to include cyber and geospatial forces and expertise. Additionally, it is the service cryptologic component (SCC) responsible to the National Security Agency and Central Security Service for Air Force cryptographic activities.

25th AF was originally activated as the United States Air Force Security Service on 20 October 1948, at Arlington Hall, Washington, D.C., with a mission of cryptology and communications security.

25th AF was last commanded by Major General Timothy D. Haugh.

On 11 October 2019, the 25th AF and the 24th AF inactivated, and subsequently transferred their missions to the newly activated 16th Air Force.

== Overview ==
The organization organizes, trains, equips and presents assigned forces and capabilities to conduct intelligence, surveillance and reconnaissance for combatant commanders and the nation. It also implements and oversees the execution of Air Force policies intended to expand ISR capabilities.

The organization comprises over 30,000 people at about 65 locations worldwide.

On 14 July 2014, the Secretary and Chief of Staff of the Air Force announced that the Air Force ISR Agency would be reorganized into the Twenty-Fifth Air Force, a numbered air force assigned to Air Combat Command, on 1 October 2014. The redesignation took place on 29 September 2014 at Joint Base San Antonio.

== Units ==
=== Assigned units ===
Five active duty wings and one center are assigned to the Twenty-Fifth Air Force.

==== Wings ====
- 9th Reconnaissance Wing, Beale Air Force Base, California
- 55th Wing, Offutt Air Force Base, Nebraska
- 70th Intelligence, Surveillance and Reconnaissance Wing, Fort George G. Meade, Maryland
- 363d Intelligence, Surveillance and Reconnaissance Wing, Langley Field, Virginia
- 480th Intelligence, Surveillance and Reconnaissance Wing, Langley Field, Virginia

==== Centers ====
- Air Force Technical Applications Center, Patrick Air Force Base, Florida

=== Supported units ===
25 AF is responsible for mission management and support of Intelligence, Surveillance, and Reconnaissance operations.

=== Air National Guard units ===
- 102d Intelligence Wing, Otis Air National Guard Base, Massachusetts
- 181st Intelligence Wing, Terre Haute Air National Guard Base, Indiana
- 184th Intelligence Wing, McConnell Air Force Base, Kansas

== History ==
=== United States Air Force Security Service ===
Air Force Intelligence was first established as the United States Air Force Security Service (USAFSS) on 20 October 1948. The service was headquartered at Arlington Hall, a former girls school and the headquarters of the United States Army's Signals Intelligence Service (SIS) cryptography effort during World War II. The USAFSS was tasked with the cryptology and communications security missions of the newly formed United States Air Force. The USAFSS moved to Brooks Air Force Base, in San Antonio, Texas, in April 1949, and then to "Security Hill" at nearby Kelly Air Force Base in August 1953.

During the Korean War, the USAFSS personnel provided United Nations Command units with intelligence on the movements of major Korean People's Army forces from Manchuria to Wonsan. USAFSS personnel received Korean Language training at Yale University, and flew on the Douglas C-47 Skytrain to relay communications to allied ground forces on the Korean Peninsula.

During the early days of the Cold War, USAFSS crews flew missions on several aircraft converted for intelligence missions, including the Boeing B-29 Superfortress, the Lockheed C-130A-II Dreamboat, and the Strategic Air Command's Boeing RB-50 Superfortress and Boeing RC-135. The USAFSS established communications stations in Germany, Pakistan, the Philippines, and Scotland, and later installed AN/FLR-9 "Elephant Cage" radar sites in Alaska, England, Italy, Japan, the Philippines, and Turkey.

The USAFSS became involved in the Vietnam War when the Pacific Air Forces asked it to establish an Air Force Special Security Office at Tan Son Nhut Airport near Saigon in 1961. By the following year, a USAFSS squadron and three subordinate detachments were operating in Vietnam and Thailand, and USAFSS personnel supported College Eye threat warning operations. USAFSS crews also flew on Douglas EC-47 Skytrain missions to search for aircrew shot down in North Vietnam; RC-130BII Hercules Airborne Communications Reconnaissance Program (ACRP) SIGINT platforms launched out of Thailand and Da Nang Air Base, Viet Nam; and, commencing in 1967, SAC RC-135s deployed to and operating out of Kadena Air Base, Okinawa.

=== Electronic Security Command ===
On 1 August 1979, the Air Force redesignated the USAFSS as the Electronic Security Command (ESC), reflecting the organization's additional mission of improving the Air Force's use of electronic warfare technology in combat. In 1985, the Air Force tasked ESC with computer security, in addition to its intelligence and electronic warfare missions.

ESC provided intelligence support to the United States invasion of Panama in 1989 and were among the first U.S. military personnel to arrive in Saudi Arabia for the Gulf War. During that conflict, ESC personnel operated at three different locations in Saudi Arabia and Turkey.

=== Air Force Intelligence Command ===
On 1 October 1991, the Air Force redesignated ESC as the Air Force Intelligence Command (AFIC) and consolidated Air Force intelligence functions and resources into a single command. AFIC merged ESC with the Air Force Foreign Technology Center at Wright-Patterson Air Force Base, Ohio, the Air Special Activities Center at Fort Belvoir, Virginia, and elements of the Air Force Intelligence Agency, Washington, D.C. With the combined missions, AFIC was tasked with intelligence, security, electronic combat, foreign technology, and treaty monitoring.

=== Air Intelligence Agency ===
The organization was redesignated again when it became the Air Intelligence Agency on 1 October 1993. During the 1990s, AIA personnel deployed to support NATO operations during the Bosnian War and Kosovo War, and as part of Operations Southern Watch and Northern Watch in Southwest Asia.

In February 2001, the Air Force assigned AIA to Air Combat Command, where it provided support to combat operations in the war on terror, the War in Afghanistan, and the Iraq War.

=== Air Force ISR Agency ===
In August 2006, General T. Michael Moseley, the Chief of Staff of the United States Air Force, directed that the Air Force intelligence efforts stress intelligence, surveillance and reconnaissance (ISR) capabilities. AIA was eventually redesignated the Air Force ISR Agency (AFISRA) on 8 June 2007. The organization change included transforming AFISRA into a field operating agency and reassigning it from Air Combat Command to Headquarters Air Force. With the change, AFISRA reported to the Air Force Deputy Chief of Staff for Intelligence, Surveillance and Reconnaissance.

Beginning in 2009, AFISRA personnel deployed to Iraq and Afghanistan to support MC-12W as part of Project Liberty.

=== Lineage ===
- Established as United States Air Force Security Service on 20 October 1948

Organized as a major command on 26 October 1948
Redesignated: Electronic Security Command on 1 August 1979
Redesignated: Air Force Intelligence Command on 1 October 1991
Redesignated: Air Intelligence Agency on 1 October 1993
Redesignated: Air Force Intelligence, Surveillance, and Reconnaissance Agency on 8 June 2007
Redesignated: Twenty-Fifth Air Force on 1 October 2014

- Inactivated on 11 October 2019

=== Assignments ===
- United States Air Force, 26 October 1948
- Air Combat Command, 1 February 2001
- United States Air Force, 8 June 2007
- Air Combat Command, 1 October 2014

=== Components ===
==== Wings ====
- 6900th Security Wing, Landsberg AB, Germany, 1 August 1954 – Unknown
- 6910th Electronic Security Wing, Lindsey AS, Germany, 1 July 1981 – 15 July 1988
- 6910th Security Wing, Darmstadt, Germany, Unknown – 1 February 1970
- 6920th Security Wing, Wheeler AFB, Hawaii, 1 November 1958 – Unknown
- 6920th Security Wing, Misawa AB, Japan, 1 February 1976 – 1 October 1978
- 6921st Security Wing, Misawa AB, Japan, 1 September 1962 – 1 February 1976
- 6922d Security Wing, Kadena AB, Okinawa, then Clark AB, Philippines, 1 July 1963 – 28 January 1973
- 6931st Security Wing, Iraklion Air Station, Crete, Greece prior to November 1971 and after 23 May 1973
- 6933d Security Wing, Karamursel AS, Turkey, 1 July 1963 – April 1970
- 6937th Communications Group, Peshawar Pakistan 1959 – Jan 1971
- 6940th Air Base Wing (later 6940th Technical Training Wing and 6940th Security Wing), Goodfellow AFB, TX, 1 October 1958 – 1 July 1978
- 6940th Electronic Security Wing, Fort Meade, MD, 1 February 1980 – 1 October 1991
- 6944th Security Wing, Offutt AFB, NE, 1 April 1974 – 1 March 1979
- 6950th Security Wing. RAF Chicksands, UK, 1 July 1963 – 1 April 1970
- 6960th Electronic Security Wing, Kelly AFB, TX, 1 January 1980 – 1 October 1986

==== Groups and Centers ====
- 6901st Special Communications Center, Brooks Air Force Base (to 1 August 1953) Kelly Air Force Base, Texas, 1 July 1953 – 8 August 1953
- 6902nd Special Communications Center, Brooks Air Force Base (to 1 August 1953) Kelly Air Force Base, Texas, 1 July 1953 – 8 August 1953
- Air Force Special Communications Center (later Electronic Warfare Center, Air Force Information Warfare Center, Air Force Information Operations Center), Kelly AFB, Texas, 8 August 1953 – 1 May 2007
- 6917th Electronic Security Group, San Vito dei Normanni Air Station, Italy, until July 1993

=== Stations ===
- Arlington Hall, Washington, D.C., 26 October 1948
- Brooks Air Force Base, San Antonio, TX, 18 April 1949
- Kelly Air Force Base (now Kelly Field Annex), San Antonio, TX, 1 August 1953

== List of commanders ==
No.	Commander		Term		
No.	Portrait	Name	Took office	Left office	Term length
1	John N.T. Shanahan	Major General; John N.T. Shanahan	29 September 2014	3 August 2015	308 days
2	Bradford J. Shwedo	Major General; Bradford J. Shwedo	3 August 2015	31 May 2017	1 year, 301 days
3	Mary F. O’Brien	Major General; Mary F. O’Brien	31 May 2017	29 August 2019	2 years, 90 days
4	Timothy D. Haugh	Major General; Timothy D. Haugh	29 August 2019	11 October 2019	43 days

== See also ==
- Air Force Office of Special Investigations
- Military Intelligence Corps
- National Reconnaissance Office
- Office of Naval Intelligence
