= Air Staff (United States) =

US Air Force headquarters staff

The Air Staff
- Headquarters Air Force badge

Agency overview
- Formed: 1947
- Headquarters: Pentagon
- Agency executive: Kenneth S. Wilsbach (CSAF)
- Parent agency: Department of the Air Force

The Air Staff is one of the Department of the Air Force's two statutorily designated headquarters staffs: the other staff is the Office of the Secretary of the Air Force, also known as the Secretariat. (Note: The Department contains a third headquarters staff, the Space Staff; however, unlike the Air Staff and the Office of the Secretary, the existence of the Space Staff is not a statutory provision.) The Air Staff is established by the United States Code Title 10 chapter 905. The Air Staff is headed by the chief of staff of the Air Force General Kenneth S. Wilsbach. The Air Staff is primarily composed of uniformed United States Air Force officials who assist the chief of staff in carrying out his dual-hatted role: as the principal military advisor to the secretary of the Air Force, and as a member of the Joint Chiefs of Staff.

The Air Staff was reorganized in 2006 to be numbered in accordance with the Joint Staff system. For the most part, the Joint Staff numbering system applies to the air staff. The Air Force separated Analysis and Assessments from A8 to create a separate directorate, A9, then in 2008, followed up with the creation of a separate directorate, A10, for the Air Force's nuclear mission.

== Joint Staff organization ==
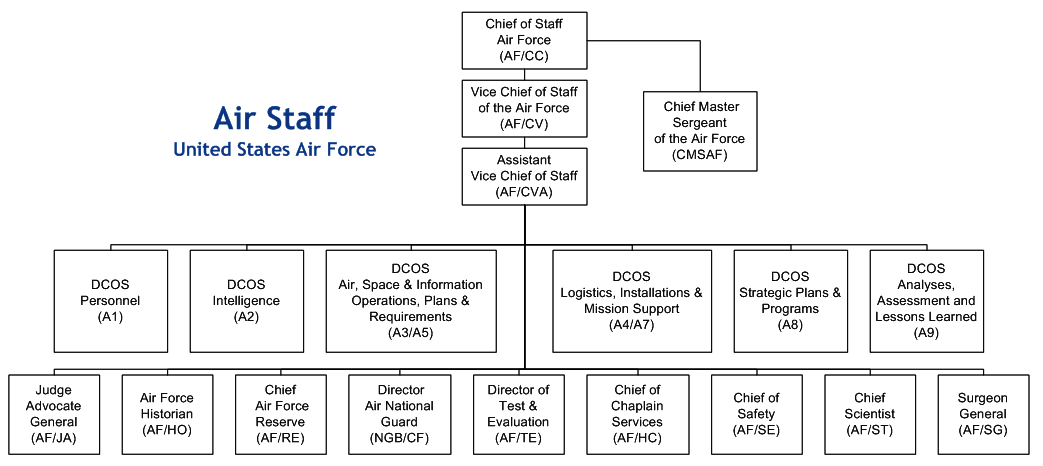
Air Staff Organizational Chart

For brief reference, the organization of the Joint Staff follows. See the full article for more details, and the Continental Staff System for discussion.

The Joint Chiefs of Staff organization includes the following departments where all the Joint Staff's planning, policies, intelligence, manpower, communications and logistics functions are translated into action.

National Level Command Structure

- DOM – Directorate of Management
- J1 – Manpower and Personnel
- J2 – Joint Staff Intelligence
- J3 – Operations
- J4 – Logistics
- J5 – Strategic Plans and Policy
- J6 – Command, Control, Communications and Computer Systems (C4)
- J7 – Joint Force Development
- J8 – Force Structure, Resources, and Assessment

Air Staff

- A1 – Manpower, Personnel, and Services
- A2 – Intelligence, Surveillance and Reconnaissance
- A3 – Operations
- A4 – Logistics
- A5 – Plans and Requirements
- A6 – Warfighter Communications and Cyber Systems
- A7 – Installations and Mission Support
- A8 – Strategic Plans and Programs
- A9 – Studies, Analyses, and Assessments
- A10 – Strategic Deterrence and Nuclear Integration Office

Multiple Air Force military commands follow this structure, but for the HQ Air Force at the Pentagon, they combine several into one office (A5/8 and A4/7). In addition, unlike the other branches of the U.S. armed forces that place "force development and training" in J7 like elements (i.e., G7, N7, etc.), the Air Force has no A7 "training" organization at the HAF level, retaining that function within its A3 organization.

== Members of the Air Staff ==
- Chief of Staff of the United States Air Force (O-10)
- Vice Chief of Staff of the United States Air Force (O-10)
- Director of Staff of the United States Air Force (O-9)
- Chief Master Sergeant of the Air Force (E-9)
- Deputy Chief of Staff for Manpower, Personnel, and Services (A1) (O-9)
- Deputy Chief of Staff for Intelligence, Surveillance and Reconnaissance (A2) (O-9)
- Deputy Chief of Staff for Operations (A3) (O-9)
- Deputy Chief of Staff for Logistics, Engineering & Force Protection (A4) (O-9)
- Deputy Chief of Staff for Strategic Plans & Requirements (A5/8) (O-9)
- Deputy Chief of Staff for Warfighter Communications and Cyber Systems (A6)
- Chief Information Officer (SAF/CN) (Senior Executive Service)
- Director for Studies & Analyses, Assessments and Lessons Learned (A9) (Senior Executive Service)
- Deputy Chief of Staff for Strategic Deterrence and Nuclear Integration (A10) (O-9)
- Judge Advocate General (O-9)
- Surgeon General (O-9)
- Director, Air Force History and Museums Policies and Programs (Senior Executive Service)
- Chief of the Air Force Reserve Command (O-9)
- Director of the Air National Guard (O-9)
- Director of Tests and Evaluation (Senior Executive Service)
- Chief of Chaplain Services (O-8)
- Chief of Safety (O-8)
- Sexual Assault Prevention and Response (O-8)
- Chief Scientist of the U.S. Air Force (Senior Executive Service)

== See also ==
- Joint Chiefs of Staff
