= United States Air Force Marathon =

- Date: 21 September 2024
- Location: Wright-Patterson Air Force Base, Dayton, Ohio
- Event type: Road
- Distance: 5K run, 10K run Half marathon, Marathon
- Established: 1997
- Edition: 28
- Website: http://www.usafmarathon.com

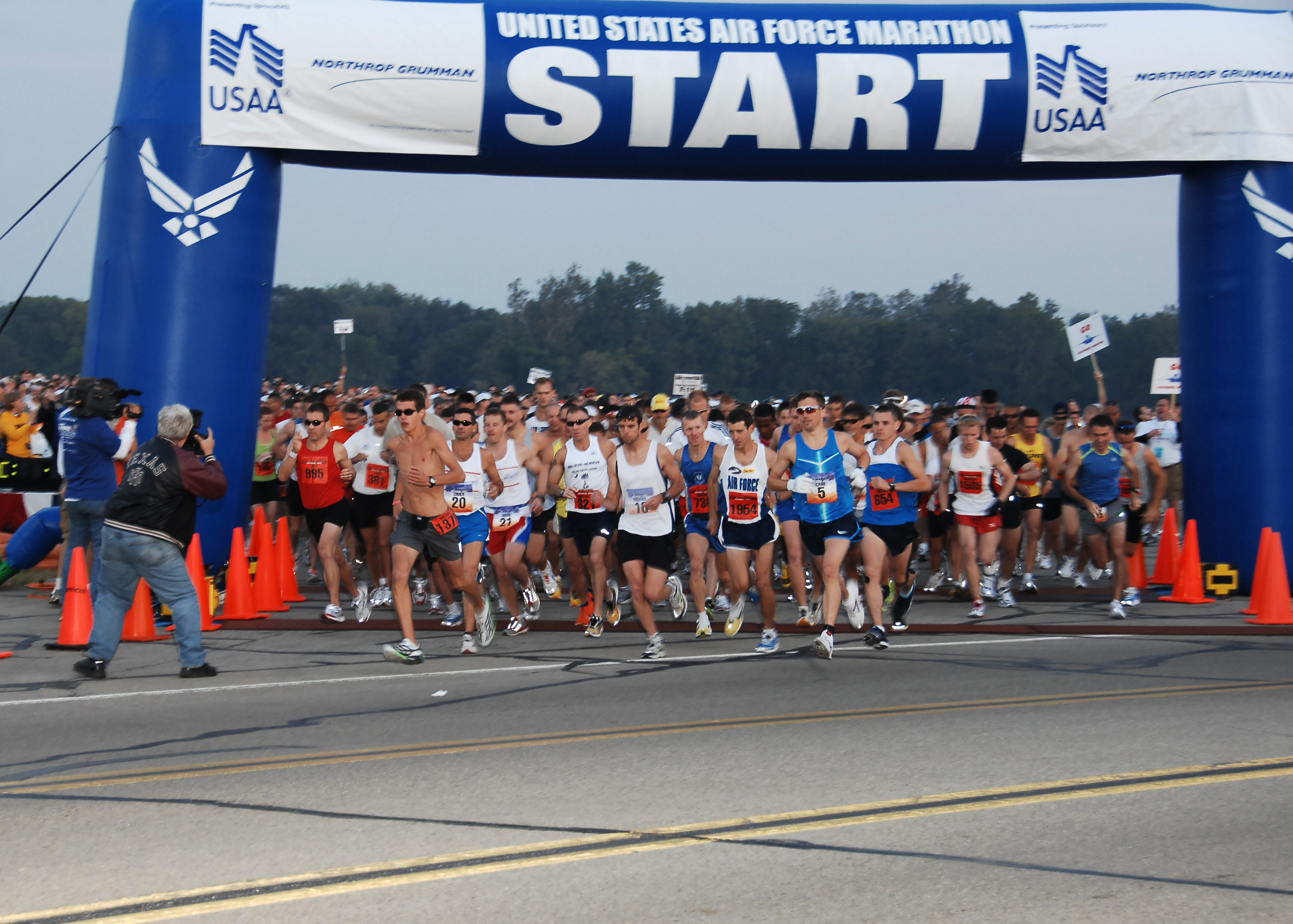
Start of the 12th annual Air Force Marathon

The United States Air Force Marathon is an annual event held on the third Saturday in September at Wright Patterson Air Force Base, Ohio, home to the National Museum of the United States Air Force. It was established in 1997 to celebrate the Air Force's 50th anniversary. The inaugural event had 2,750 entrants. In 2013, the race hosted 15,424 runners.

The event includes a full marathon, half marathon and 10K race. The Friday previous to the marathon includes a 5K race at the Nutter Center. The 26.2-mile (42.2 km) race has runners travel around historical places on Wright-Patterson and Fairborn, Ohio, including the Air Force Institute of Technology, Air Force Materiel Command headquarters, the Wright-Patterson flight line and the Wright Brothers Memorial Monument. The Air Force Marathon is a qualifying race for the Boston Marathon.

Registration for the race opens on 1 January each year, with special discounts on opening day. For the 2016 race, there were a total of 15,500 slots; 3,000 for the full marathon, 7,000 for the half marathon, 3,000 for the 10K, and 2,500 for the 5K.

The Air Force Marathon has a $14 million economic impact to the Dayton area. It has sponsorship from Boeing, Northrop Grumman and USAA.

The 2020 edition of the race was cancelled due to the coronavirus pandemic, with all registrants given the option of either running the race virtually or transferring their entry to 2021, 2022, or 2023.

== Record holders ==
Overall Male Full Marathon	Josh Cox	2:20:57	2007
Overall Military Male Full Marathon	Brian Dumm	2:27:49	2010
Overall Male Wheelchair	David Berling	1:09:50	2018
Overall Female Full Marathon	Ann Alyanak	2:52:15	2019
Overall Military Female Full Marathon	Lori M. (Eppard) Wilson	2:55:04	1997
Overall Female Wheelchair	Thea Rosa	1:41:47	2015
