= 88th Air Base Wing =

88th Air Base Wing

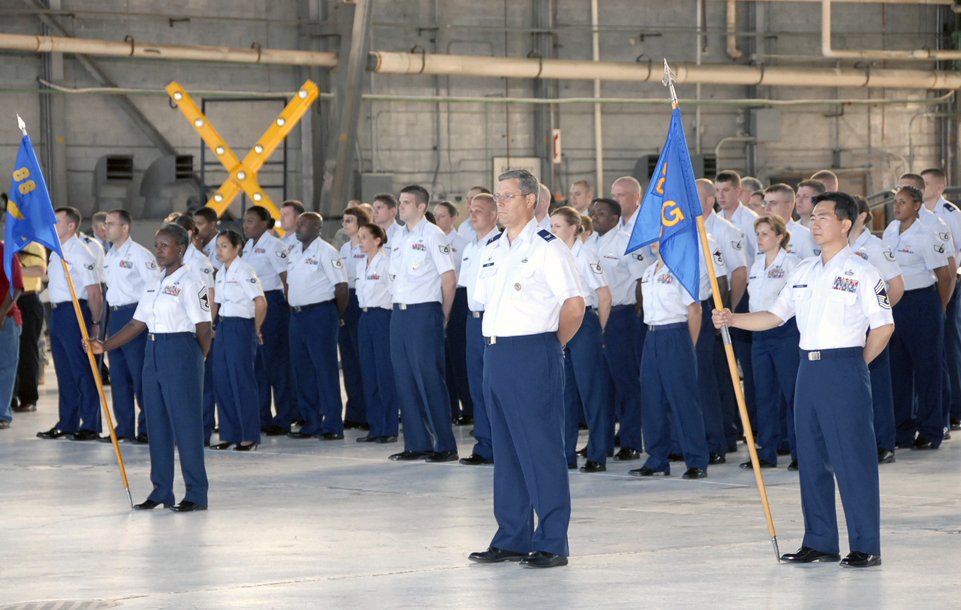
- 88th Air Base Wing Change of Command 14 July 2008
- Active: 1944-present
- Country: United States
- Branch: United States Air Force
- Role: Base support
- Part of: Air Force Materiel Command
- Garrison/HQ: Wright-Patterson Air Force Base
- Motto: Strength Through Support (1993-present)
- Decorations: Air Force Outstanding Unit Award

Commanders
- Current commander: Colonel Jason K. Okumura

Insignia
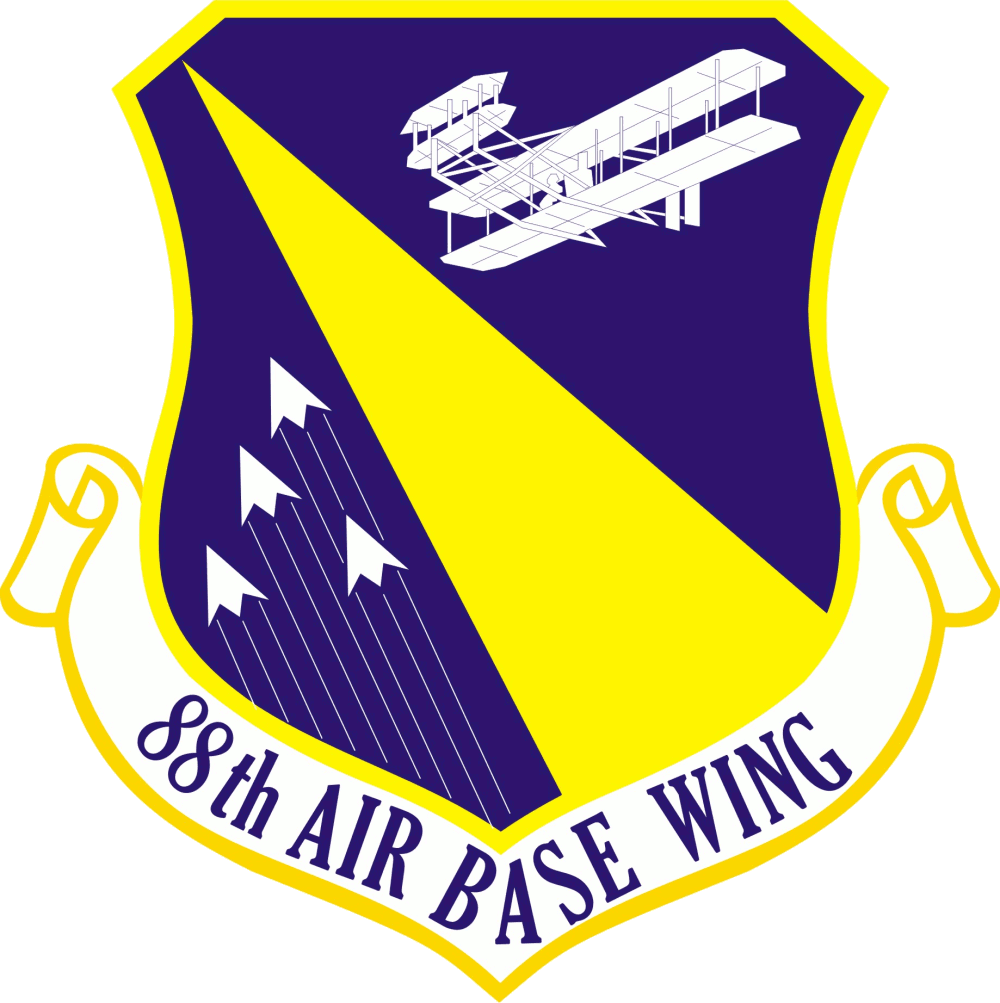
- 88th Air Base Wing emblem (Note: Approved 18 November 1993.)

The United States Air Force's 88th Air Base Wing is a base support unit located at Wright-Patterson Air Force Base, Ohio. The wing has been stationed at Wright-Patterson, known familiarly as 'Wright-Patt', since its activation in 1944 as the 4000th Army Air Forces Base Unit (Command) in 1944, and from 1944 to 1994 undergone six redesignations.

Circa 2012, the wing's mission was operate the airfield, maintain all infrastructure and provide security, communications, medical, legal, personnel, contracting, finance, transportation, air traffic control, weather forecasting, public affairs, recreation and chaplain services for more than 60 associate units on Wright-Patterson AFB.

== History ==
The unit was organized by Air Service Command to provide custodial and support functions for Wright Field. The mission of both the unit and the AAF Technical Base expanded by early 1946, gaining full support responsibility for Patterson Field. The 2750th became host wing for Wright-Patterson AFB in October 1949, exercising command jurisdiction over the base, and providing services to Headquarters of Air Force Logistics Command and numerous tenant units. It frequently supported regional humanitarian missions, such as the Xenia tornado relief in April 1974. It provided logistical support and served as a port of embarkation during contingency deployments, most notably the Vietnam War in 1965–1973, as well as to the Middle East in 1990–1991.

It deployed personnel to Saudi Arabia for 'Operation Desert Shield'/Desert Storm in August 1990-May 1991. After 1 July 1992 it provided logistic and administrative support for Headquarters, Air Force Materiel Command and the Aeronautical Systems Center, now known as the Air Force Life Cycle Management Center, as well as on-base and off-base tenant units in a five-state area and managed base facilities and resources. It provided airfield operations, security, services, engineering, and logistical support to the Balkans Proximity Peace Talks (better known as the 'Dayton Agreement') conducted at the base in late 1995.

=== Inactivation of the 88th Communications Group ===
In an inactivation ceremony on 29 April 2022, the 88th Communications Group was inactivated. The inactivation ceremony presided by then 88th Air Base Wing Commander Colonel Patrick Miller. The 88th Communications Squadron was reallocated under the 88th Mission Support Group, while the 88th Operations Support Squadron was reallocated directly under the 88th Air Base Wing.

== Lineage ==
- Designated as the 4000th Army Air Forces Base Unit (Command) and organized on 1 April 1944
- Redescribed 4000th Army Air Forces Base Unit (Air Base) on 21 February 1945
- Redesignated 4000th Air Force Base Unit (Air Base) on 26 September 1947
- Redesignated 2750th Air Force Base on 28 August 1948
- Redesignated 2750th Air Base Wing on 5 October 1949

Redesignated 645th Air Base Wing on 1 October 1992
Redesignated 88th Air Base Wing on 1 October 1994

=== Assignments ===
- Army Air Forces Technical Service Command (later Air Materiel Command, Air Force Logistics Command), 1 April 1944
- Aeronautical Systems Center, 1 July 1992 (attached to Air Force Life Cycle Management Center after 20 July 2012)
- Air Force Life Cycle Management Center, 1 October 2012

=== Components ===
==== Groups ====
- 88th Communications Group (see 2046th Communications Group)
- 88th Maintenance Group (see 2750th Logistics and Operations Group)
- 88th Medical Group, 20 October 2004 – present
- 88th Mission Support Group (see 645th Support Group)
- 645th Communications-Computer Support Group (see 2046th Communications Group)
- 645th Logistics and Operations Group (see 2750th Logistic and Operations Group)
- 645th Support Group (later 88th Support Group, 88th Mission Support Group), 1 October 1992 – present
- 2046th Communications Group (later 2046 Communications-Computer Systems Group, 645 Communications-Computer Systems Group, 88th Communications Group), c. 1 September 1990 – present
- 2750th Logistics and Operations Group (later 645th Logistics and Operations Group, 88th Logistics and Operations Group, 88 Logistics Gp, 88th Maintenance Group), c. 1990-c. 2012

==== Squadrons ====
- 88th Operations Support Squadron
- 88th Comptroller Squadron
- 88th Logistics Readiness Squadron home of the world famous Installation Deployment Readiness Cell (IDRC)
- 88th Force Support Squadron
- 88th Communications Squadron
- 88th Security Forces Squadron

==== Flight ====
- 47th Airlift Flight, 1 October 1994 – 1 July 1995

=== Stations ===
- Patterson Field, Ohio, 1 April 1944
- Wright Field (later Wright-Patterson Air Force Base), Ohio, 18 August 1944 – present (Note: Wright Fielld merged with Patterson Field on 13 January 1948. From 9 December 1947 until the merger, Wright Field, Patterson Field, Dayton Army Air Field and Clinton County Army Air Field were administratively merged as the Air Force Technical Base. Mueller, p. 605.)

=== Aircraft & Missiles Operated ===
- C-12 Huron (1993–1997)

== Present unit emblems ==
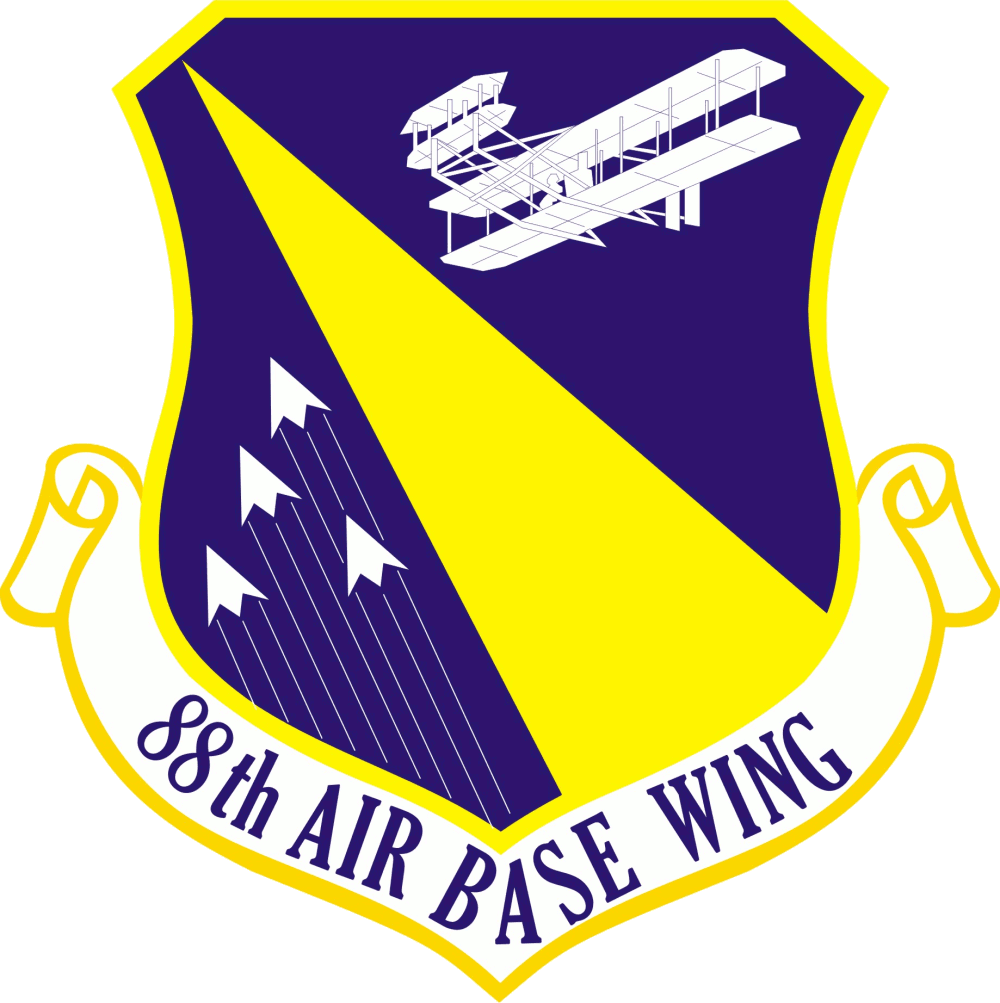
88th Air Base Wing

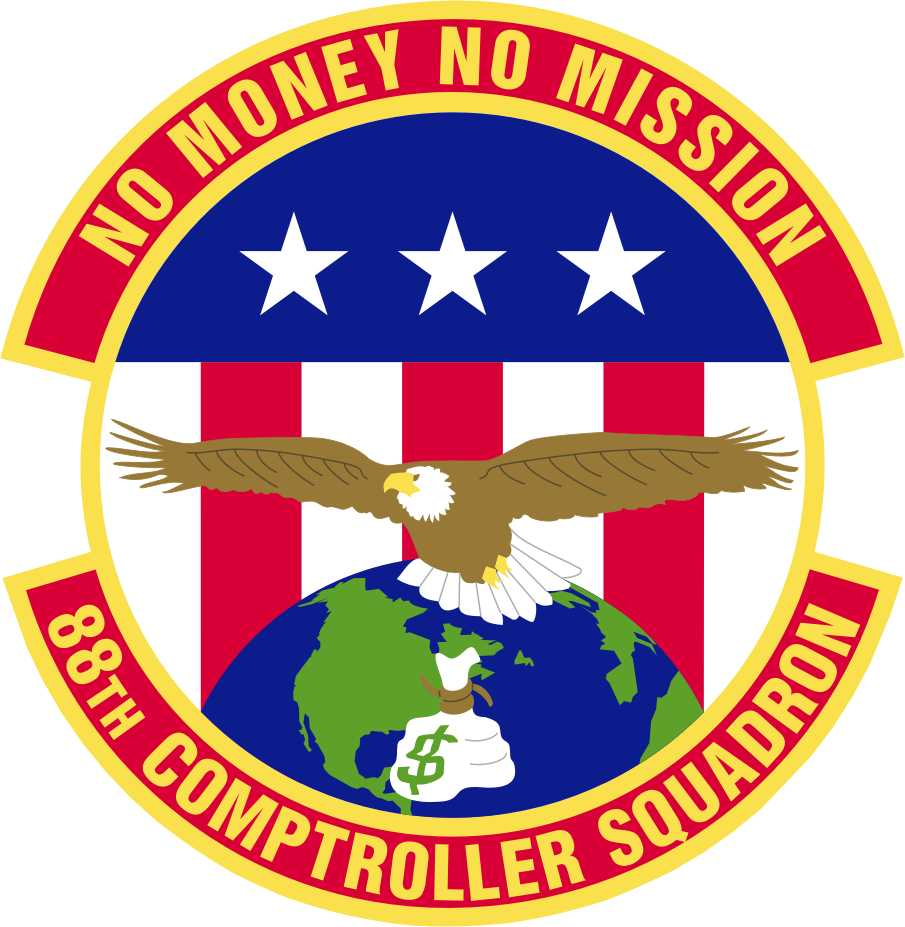
88th Comptroller Squadron

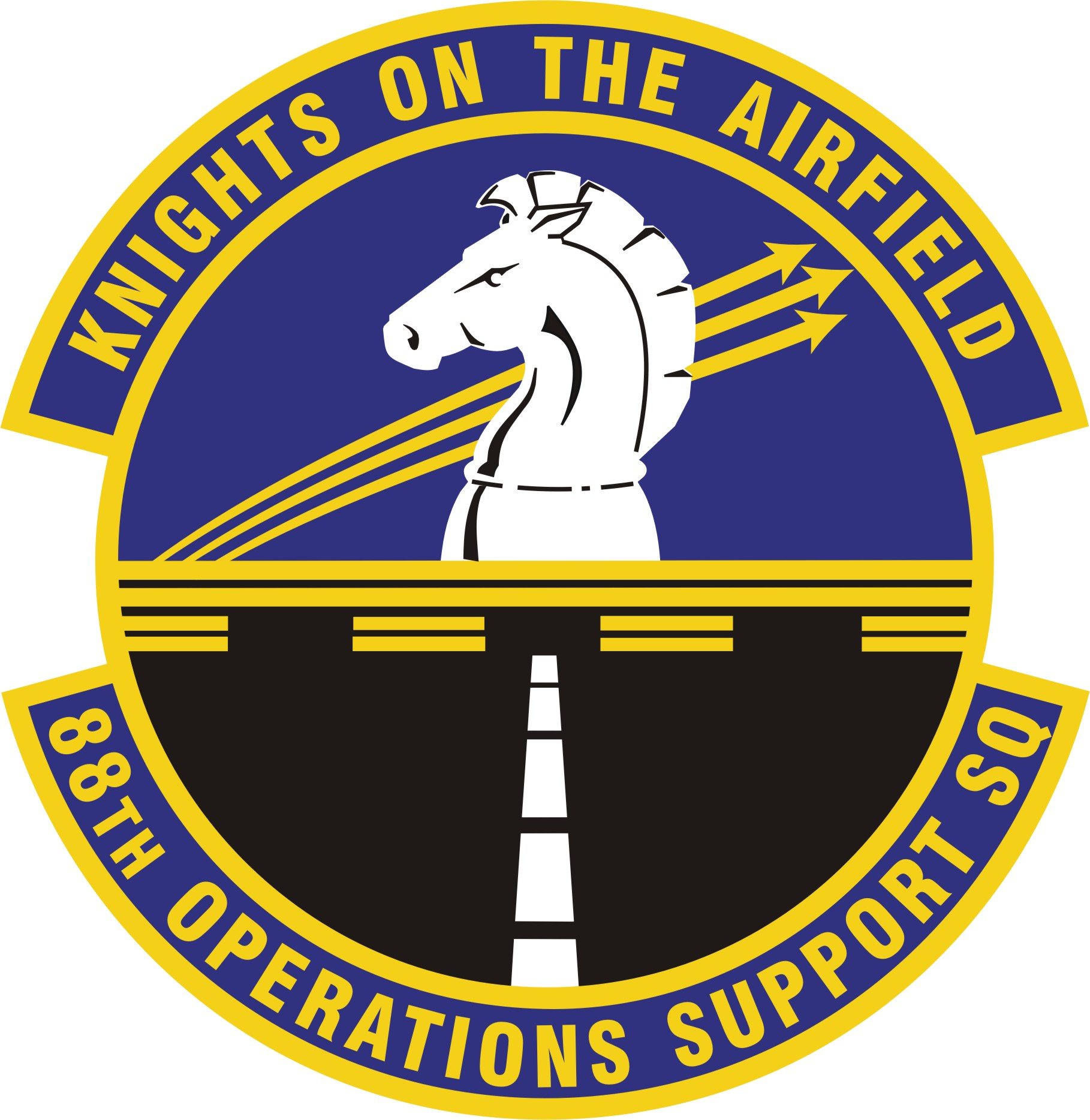
88th Operations Support Squadron

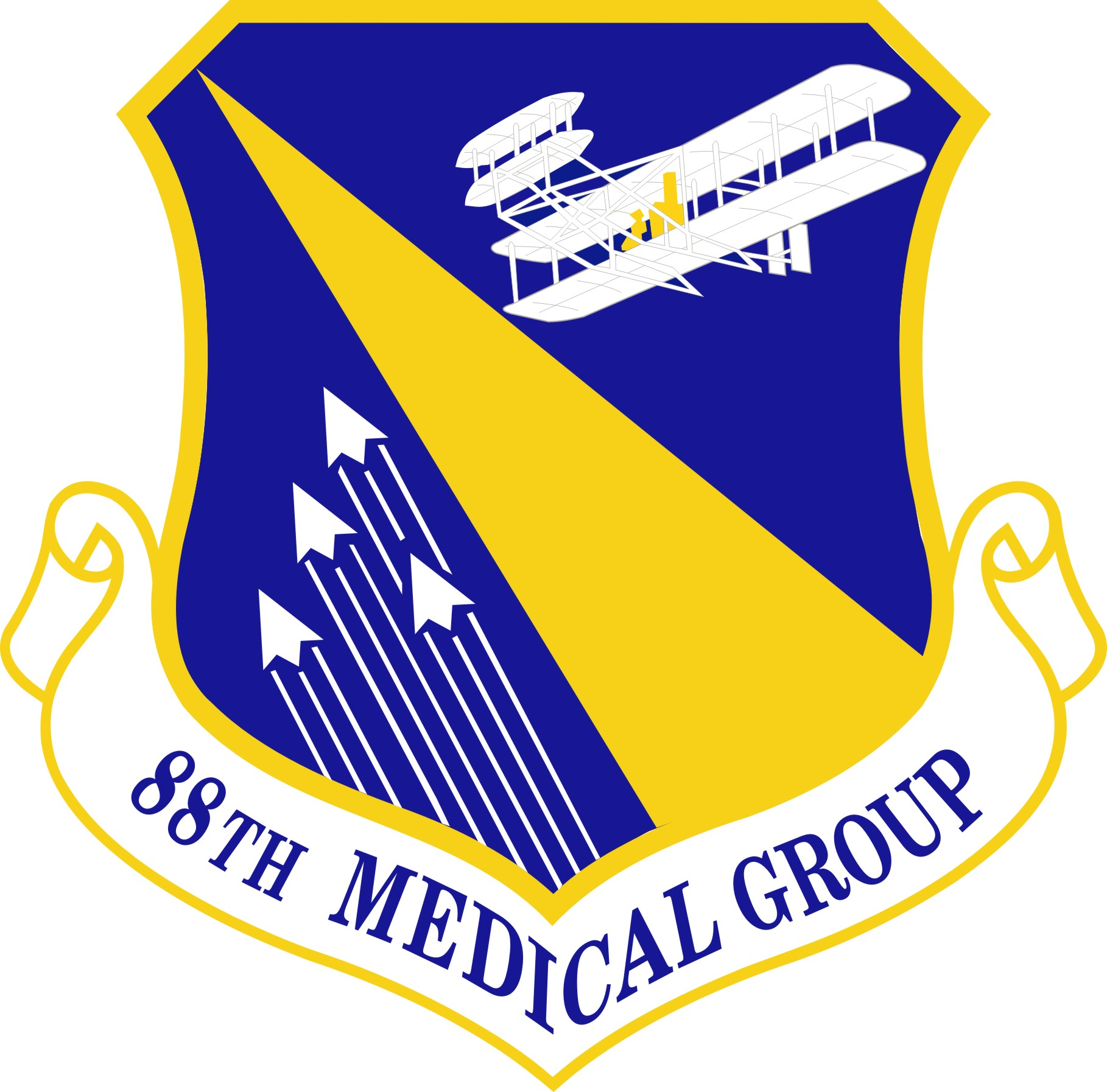
88th Medical Group

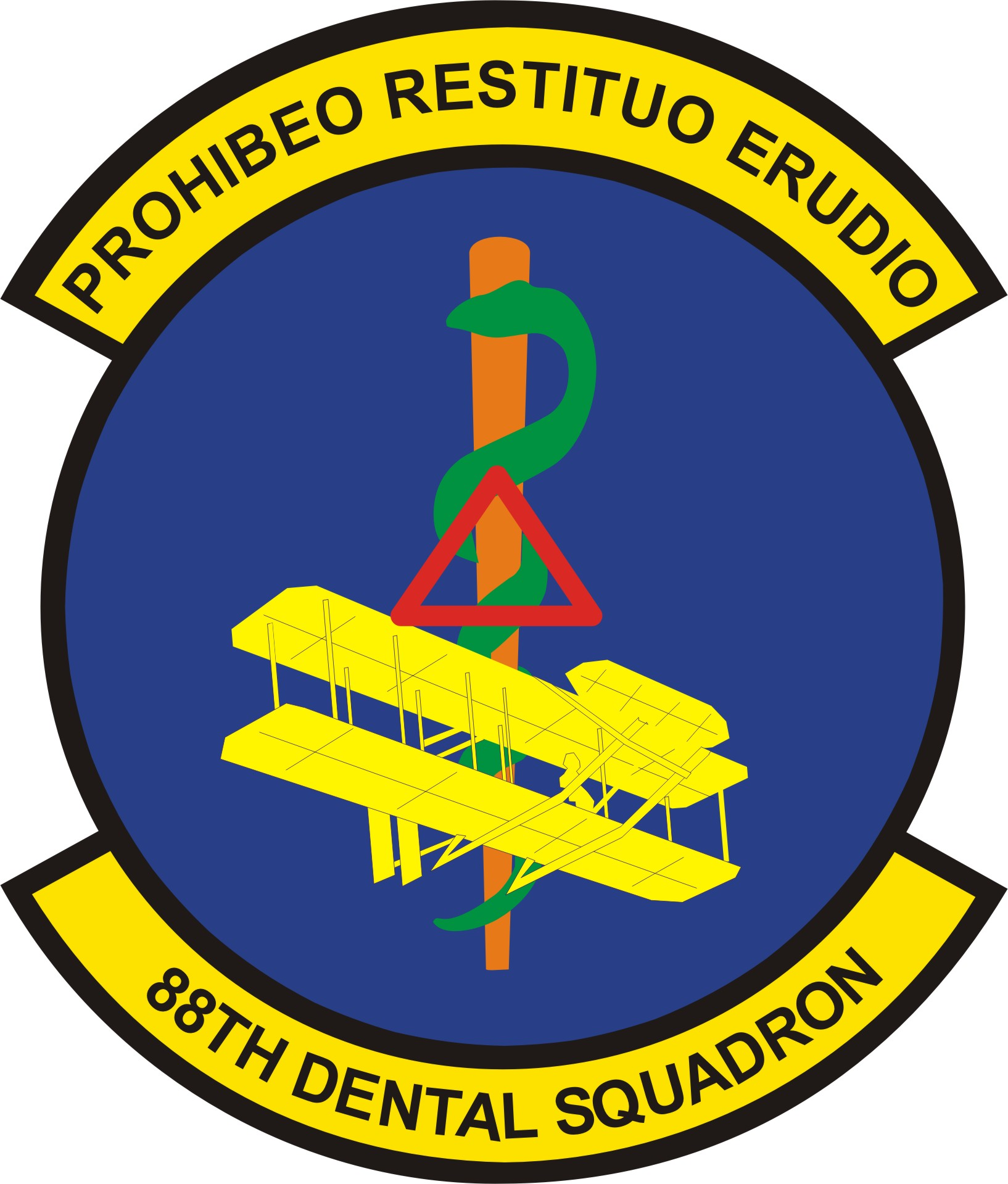
88th Dental Squadron

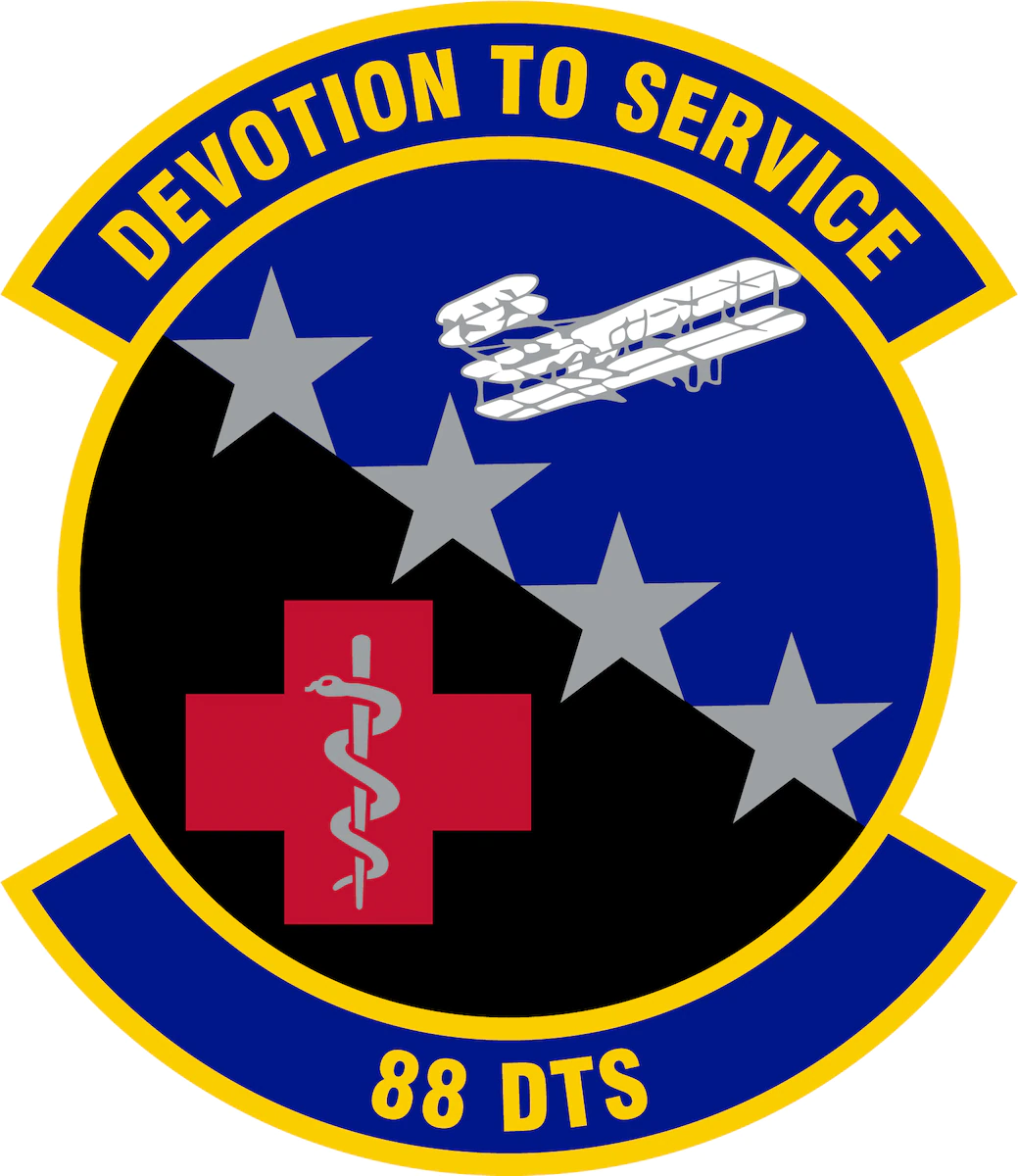
88th Diagnostics & Therapeutics Squadron

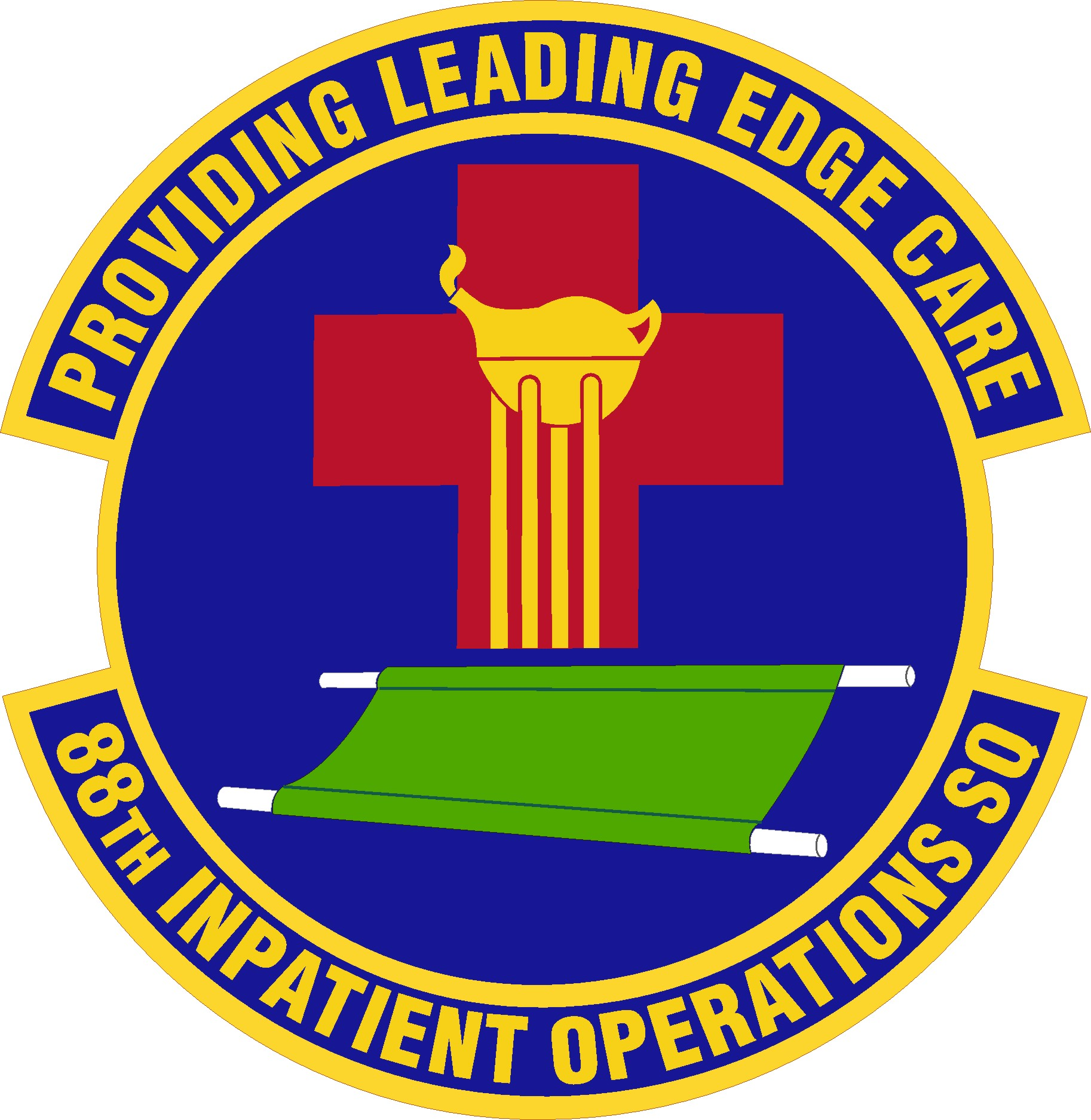
88th Inpatient Operations Squadron

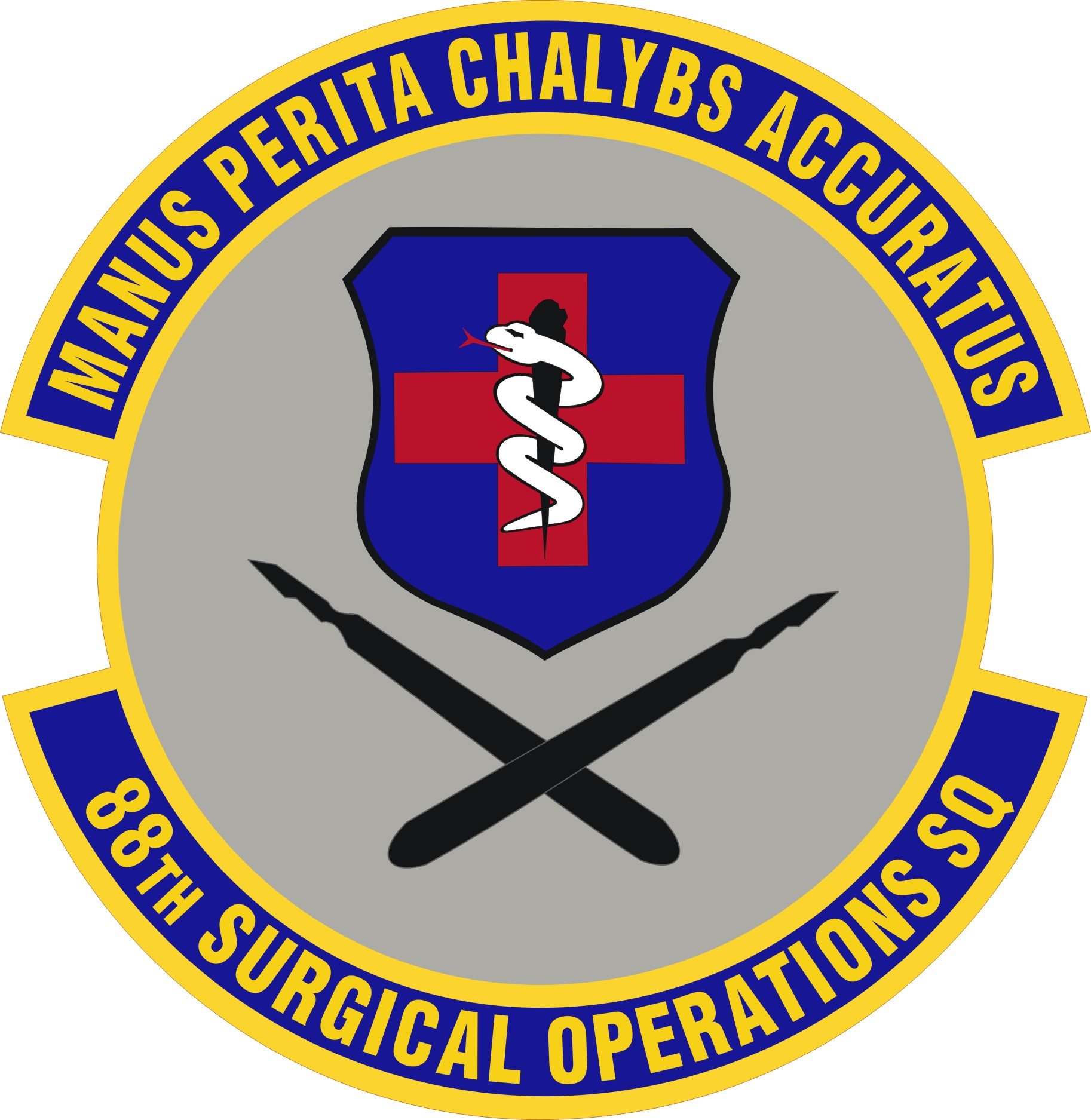
88th Surgical Operations Squadron

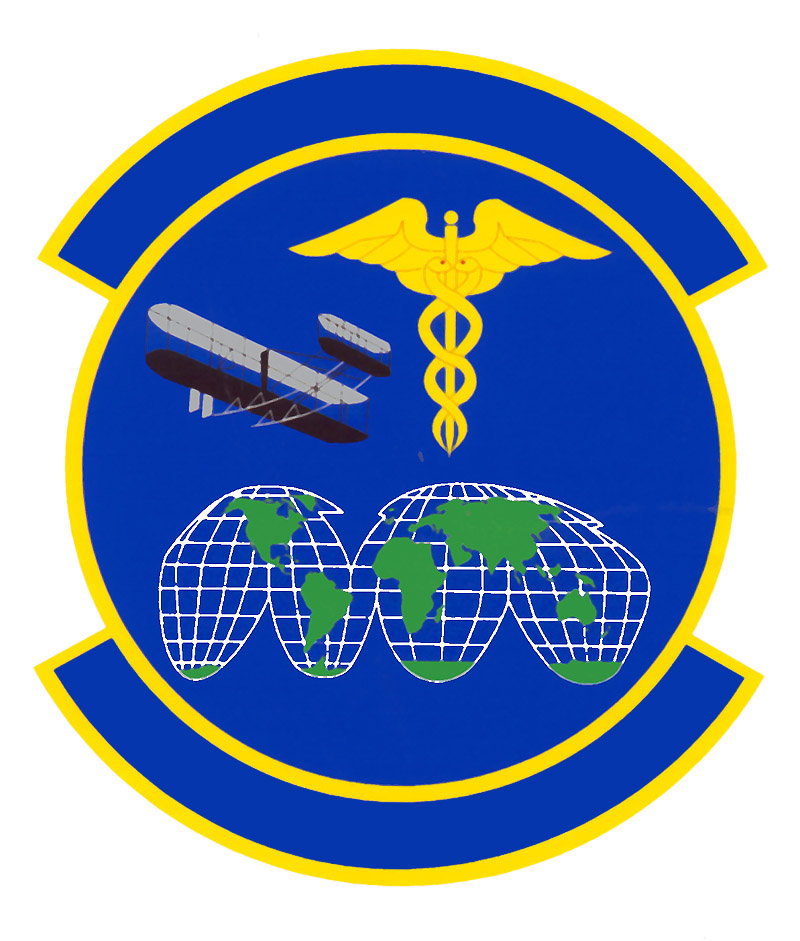
88th Operational Medical Readiness Squadron

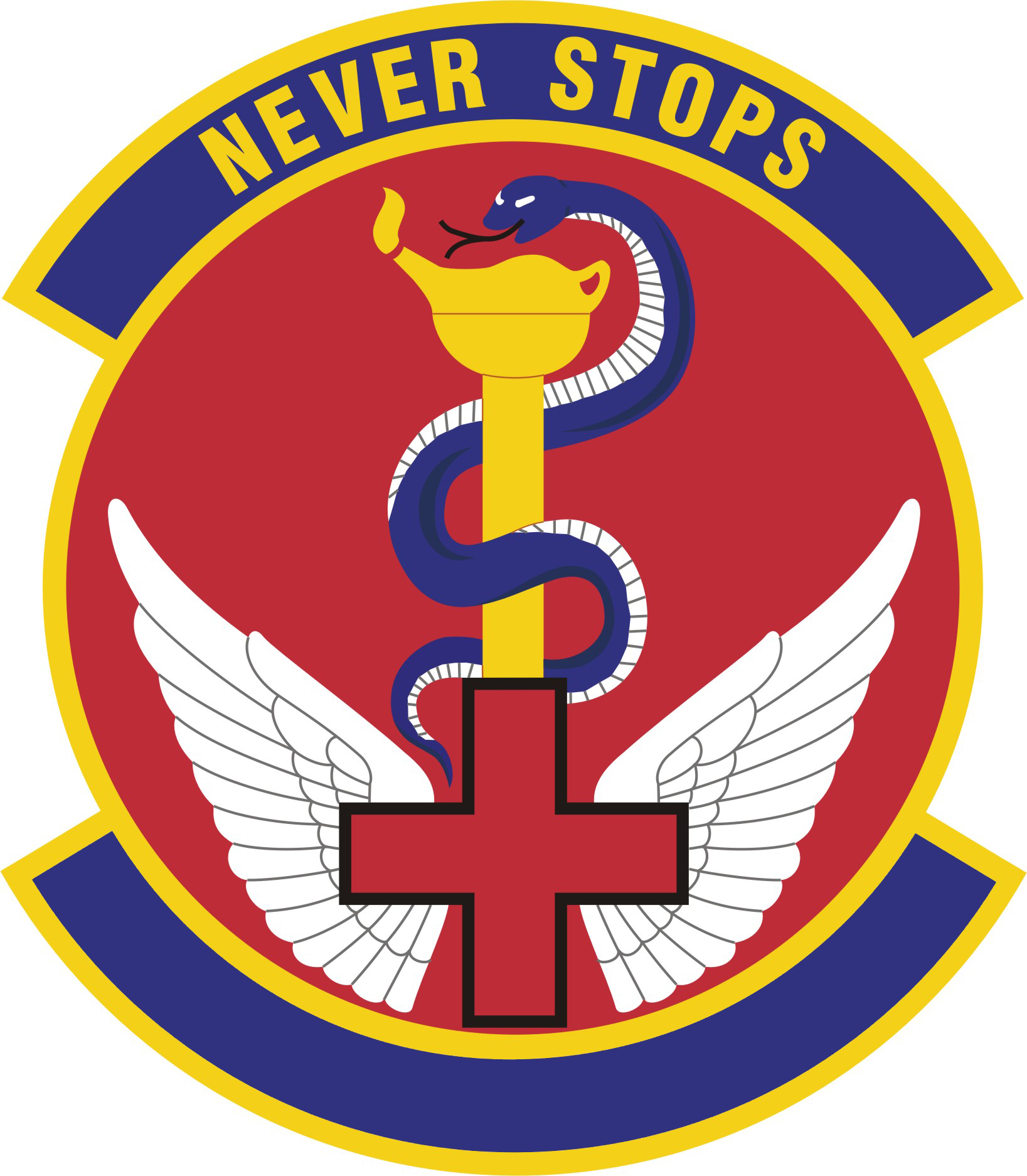
88th Healthcare Operations Squadron

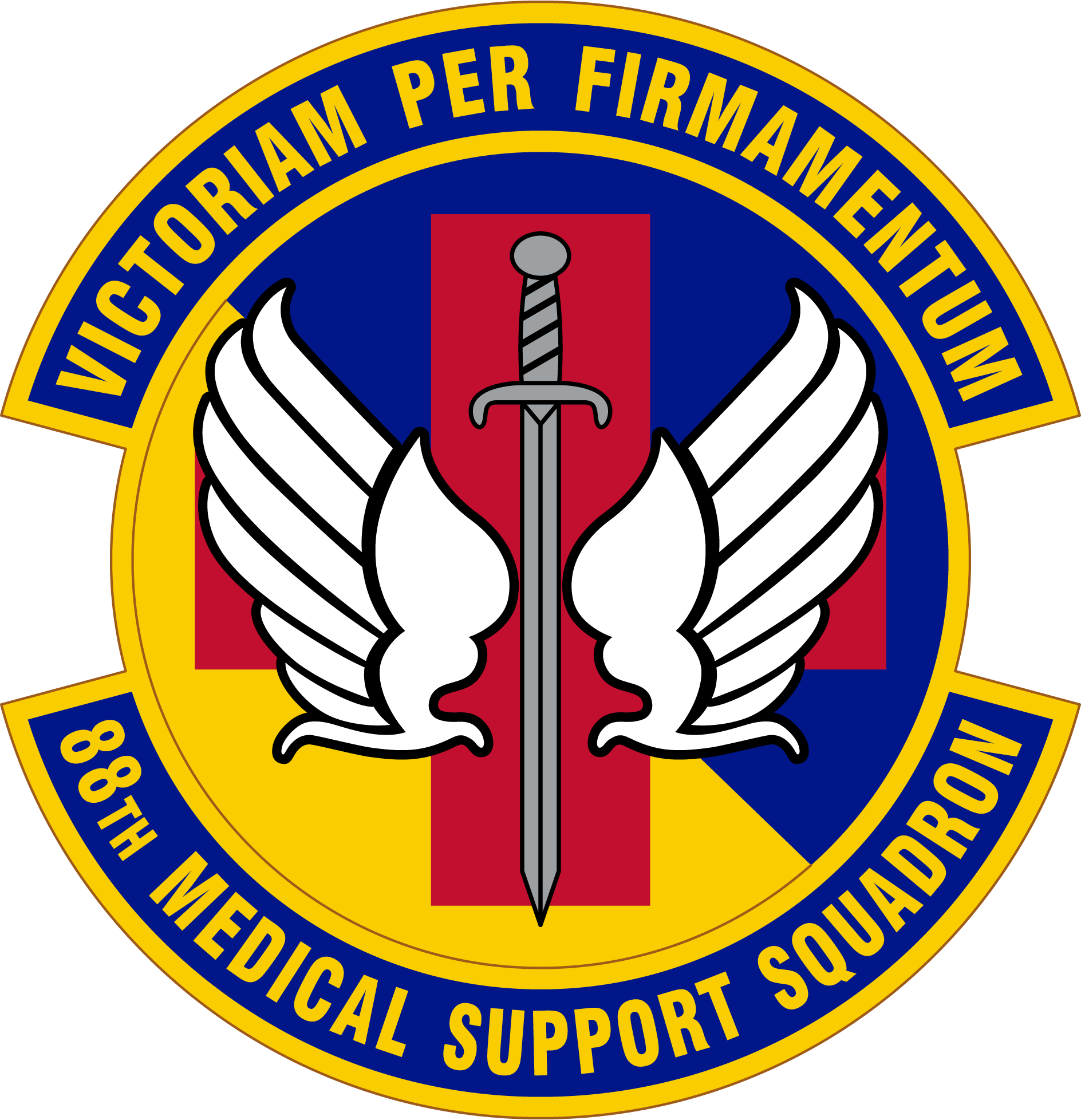
88th Medical Support Squadron

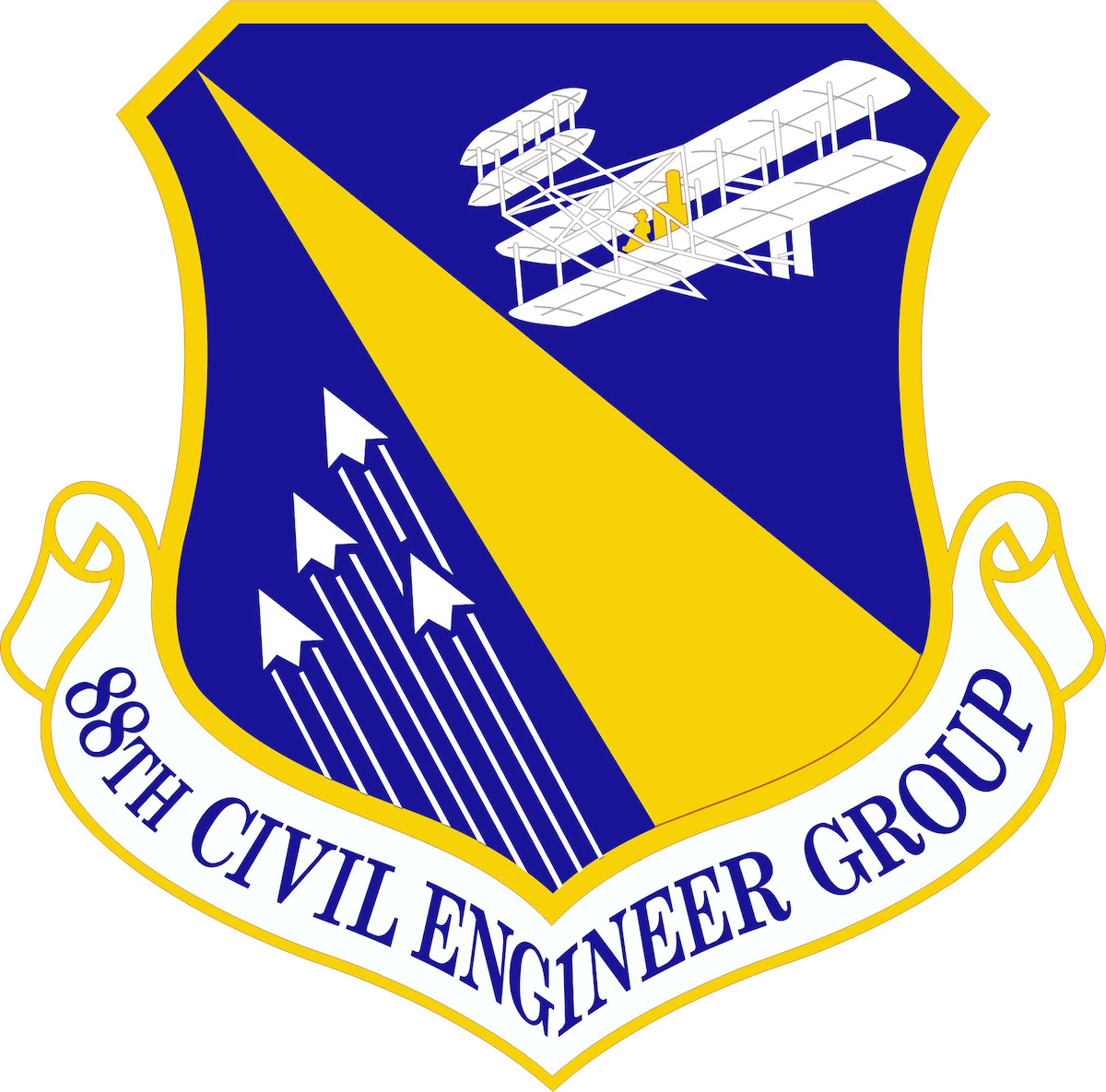
88th Civil Engineer Group

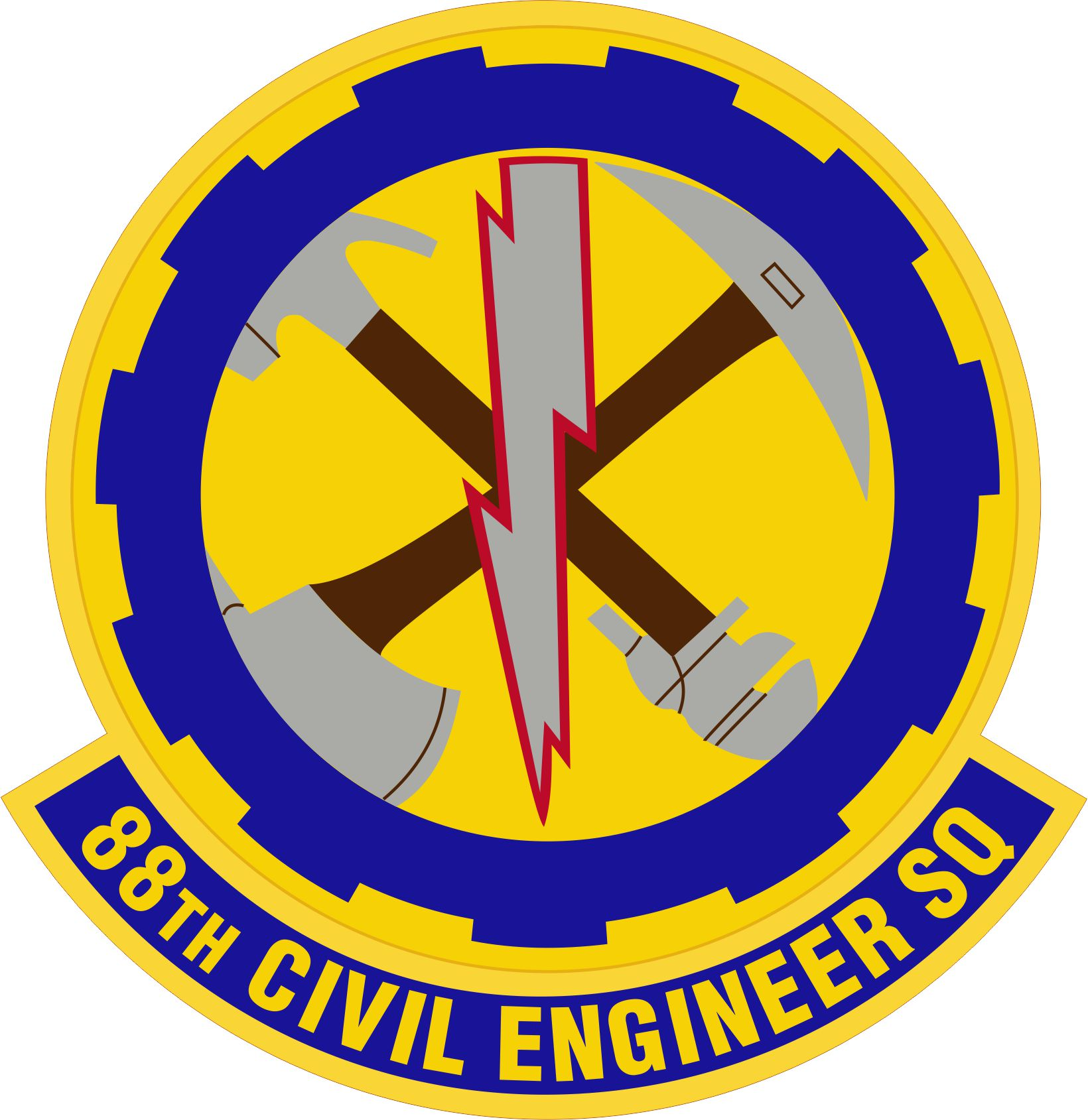
88th Civil Engineer Squadron

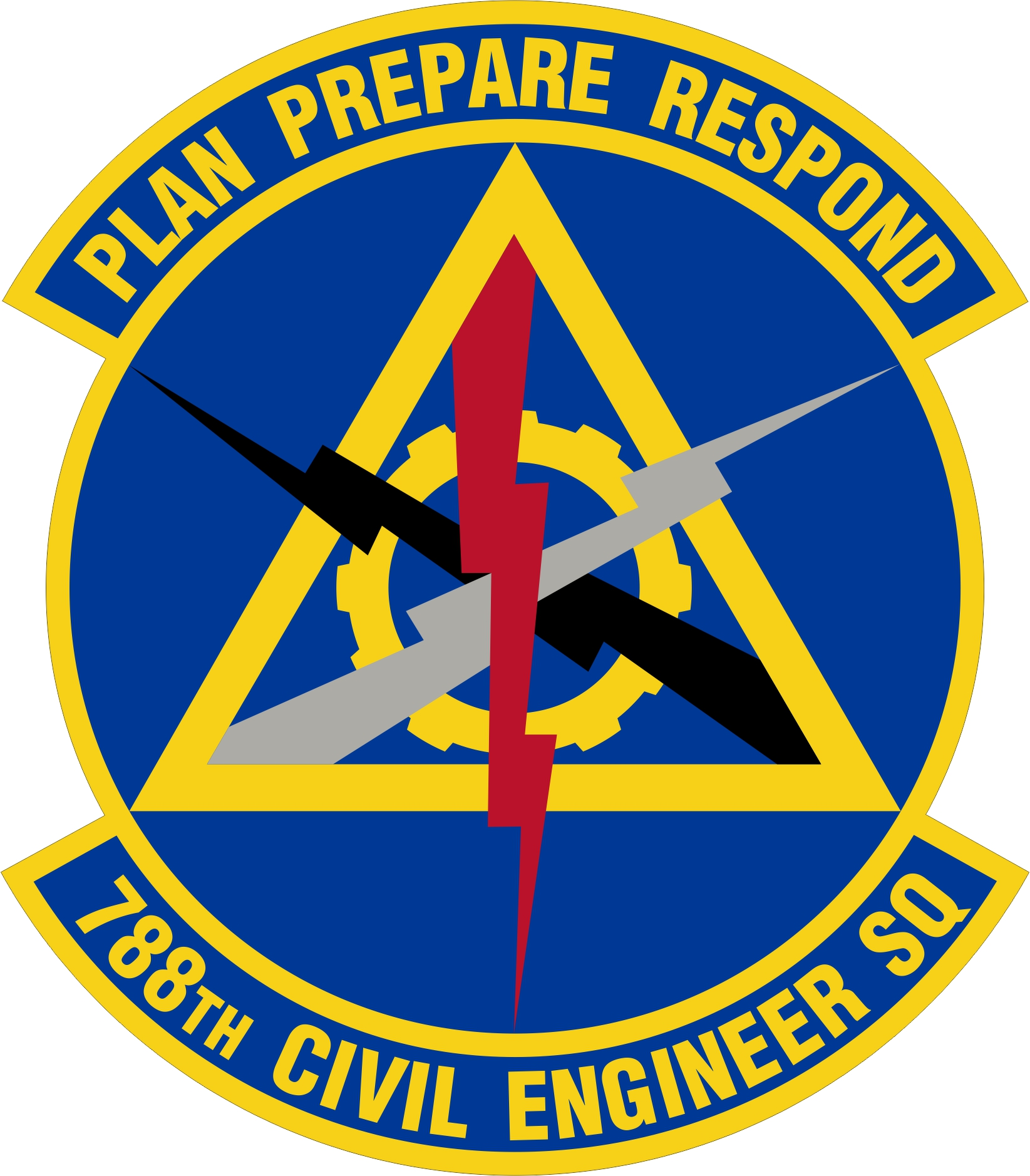
788th Civil Engineer Squadron

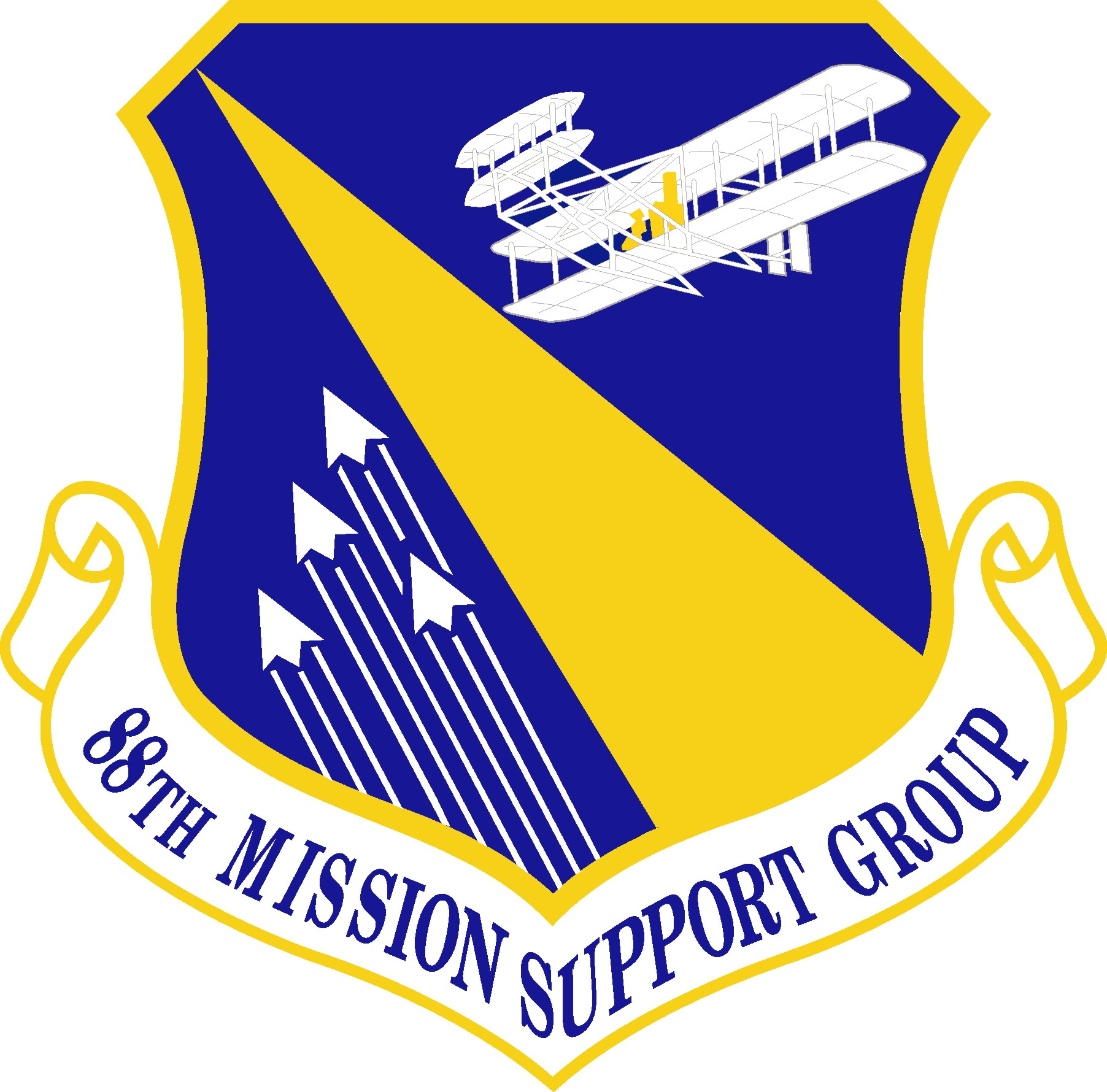
88th Mission Support Group

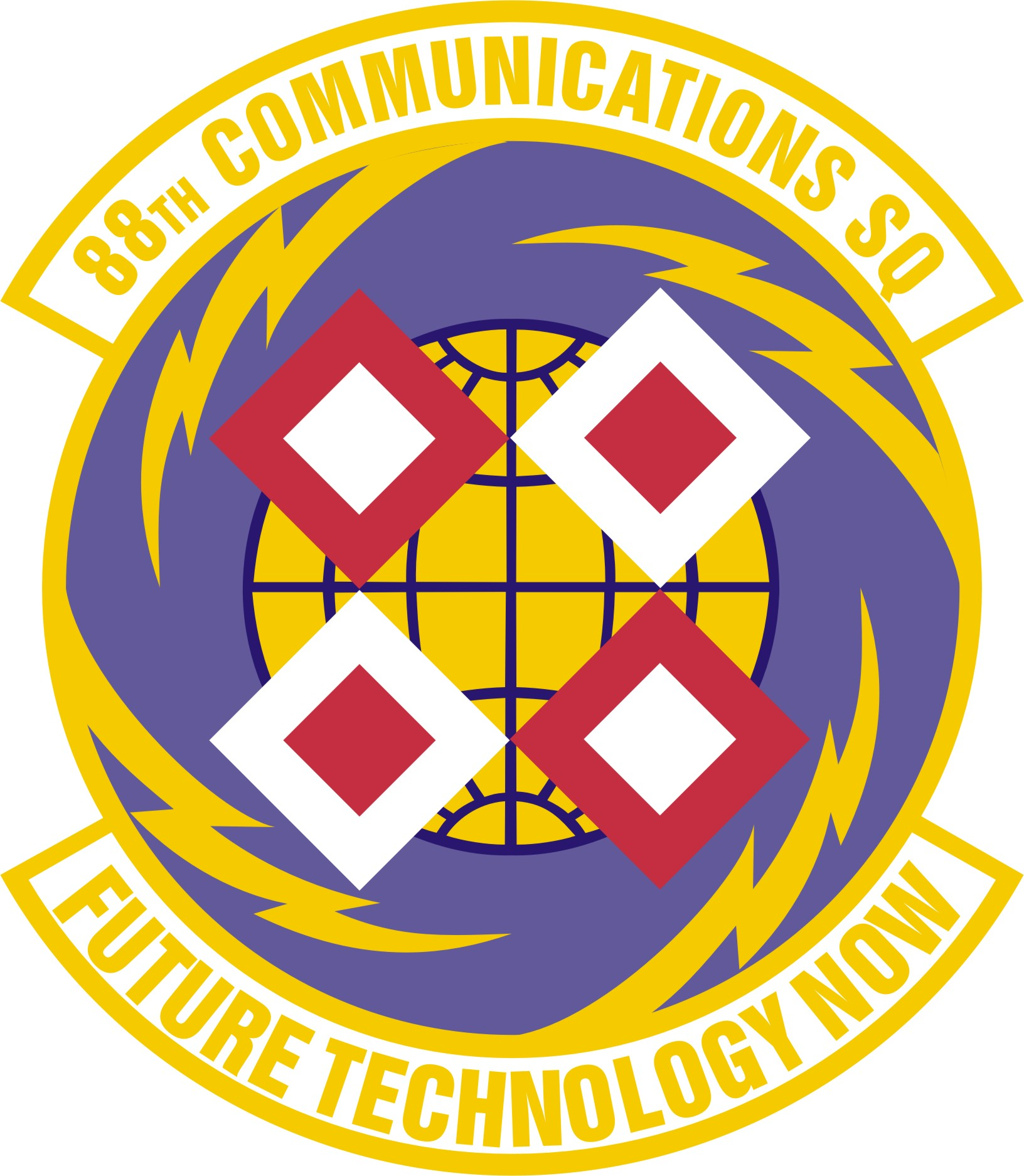
88th Communications Squadron

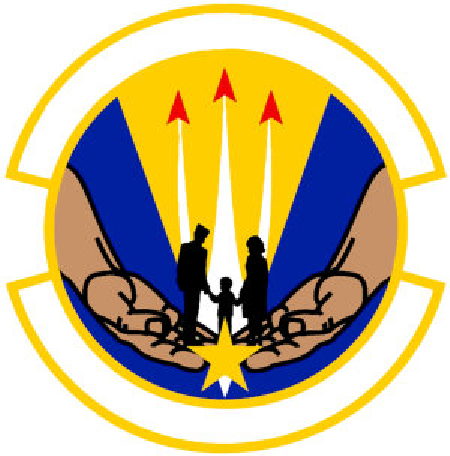
88th Force Support Squadron

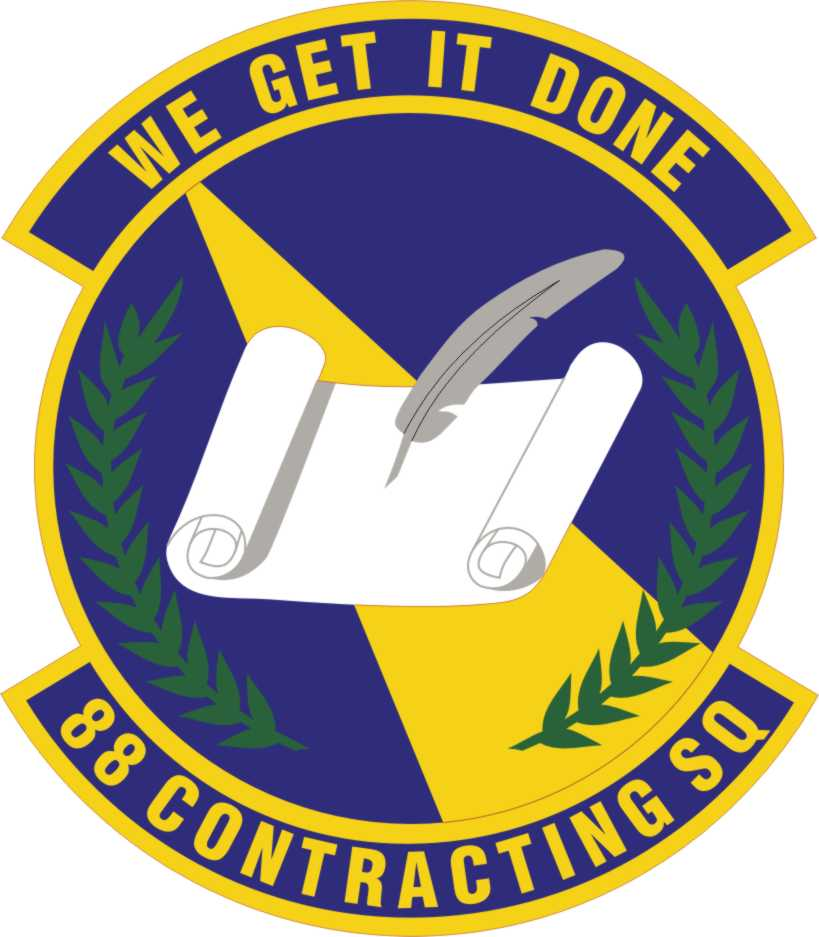
88th Contracting Squadron

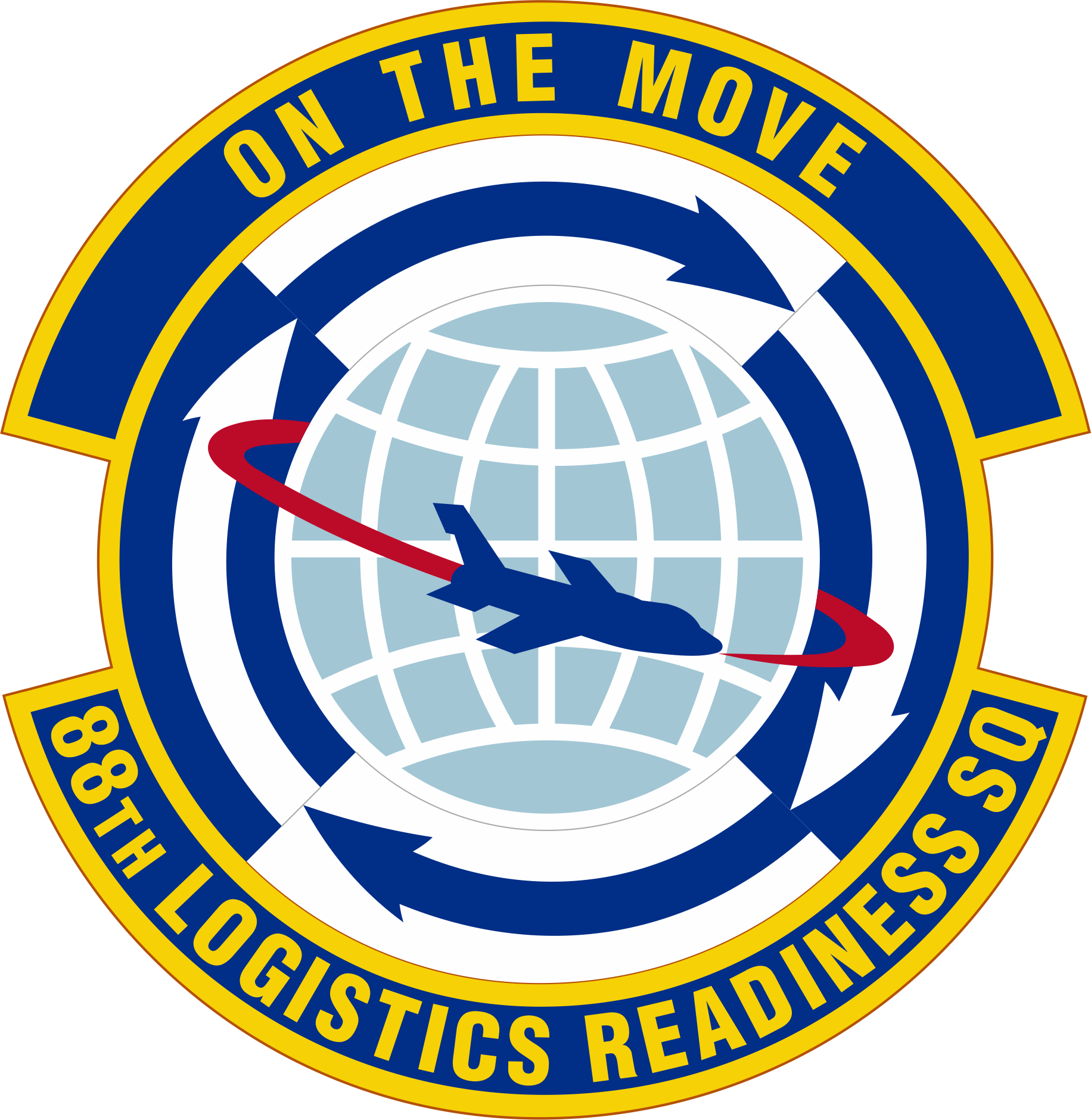
88th Logistics Readiness Squadron

== Past unit emblems ==
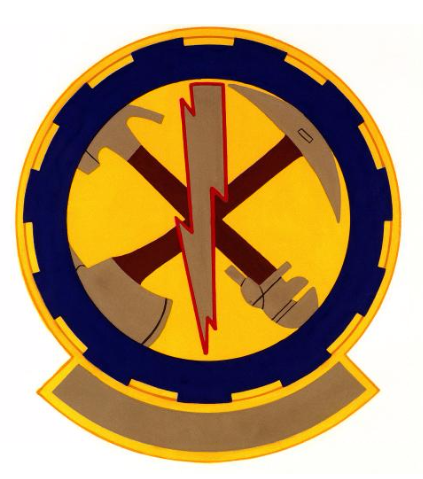
2750th Civil Engineering Squadron (later the 88th Civil Engineer Squadron)

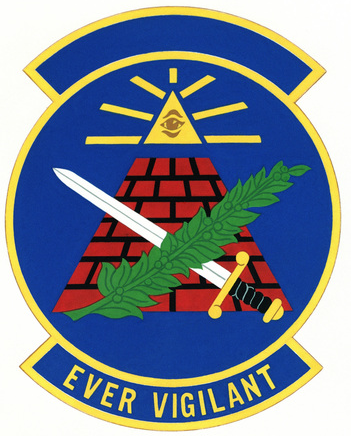
2750th Security Police Squadron (later the 88th Security Forces Squadron)

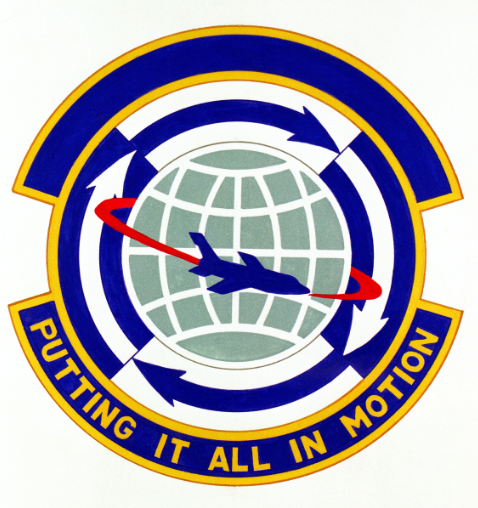
2750th Transportation Squadron (later the 88th Logistics Readiness Squadron)

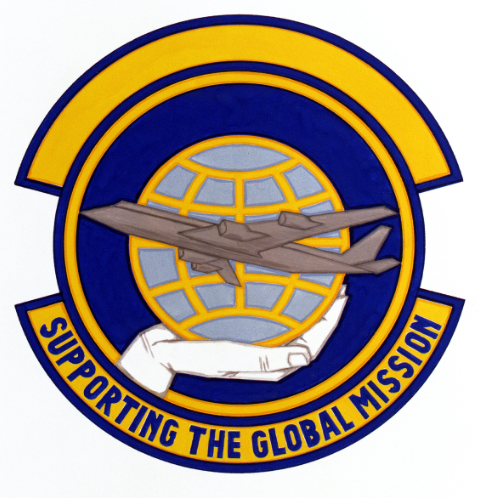
2750th Supply Squadron

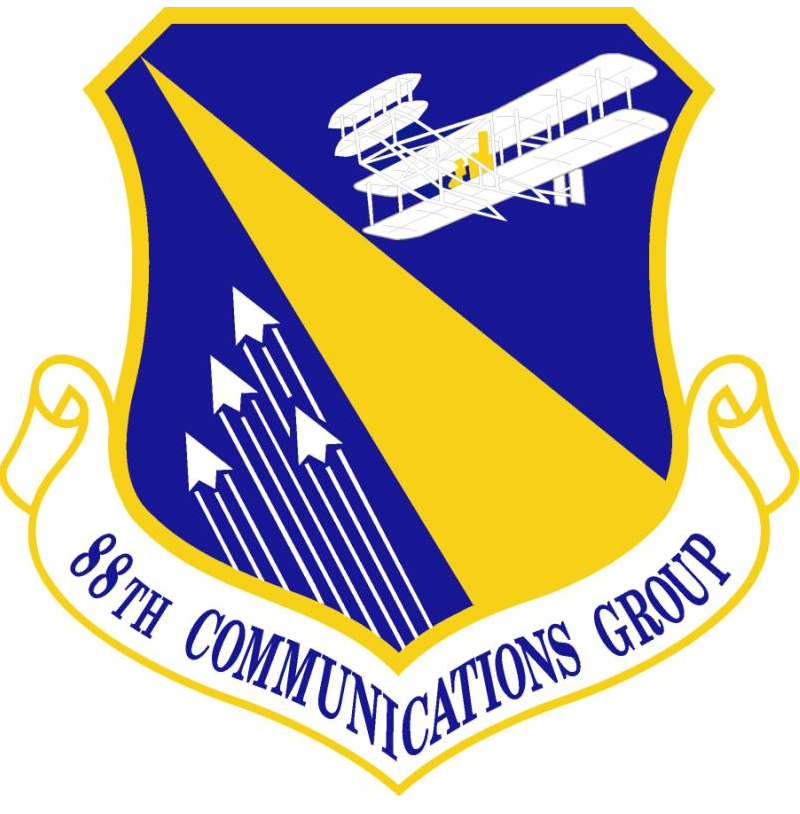
88th Communications Group (inactivated on 29 Apr 2022)

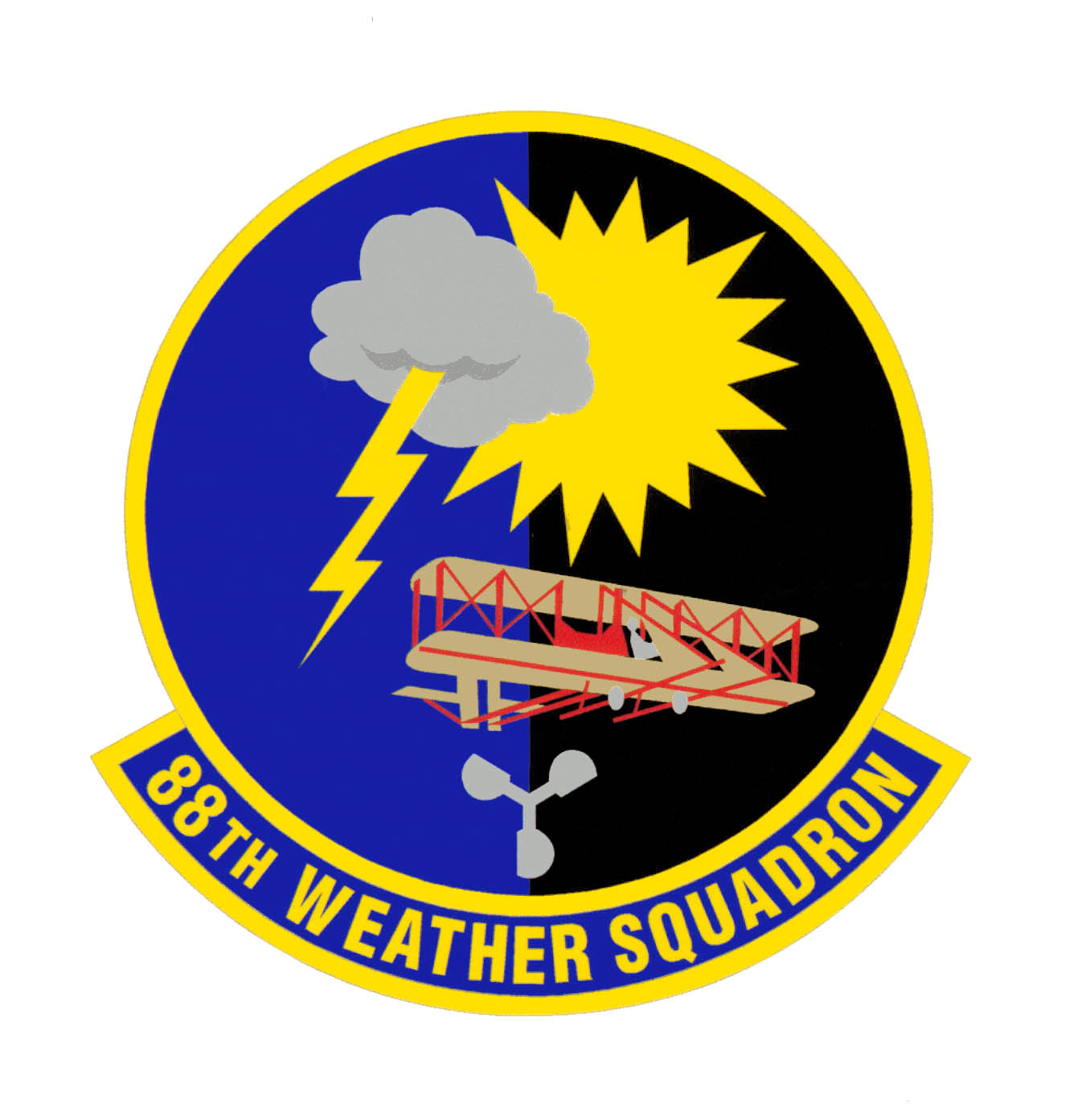
88th Weather Squadron

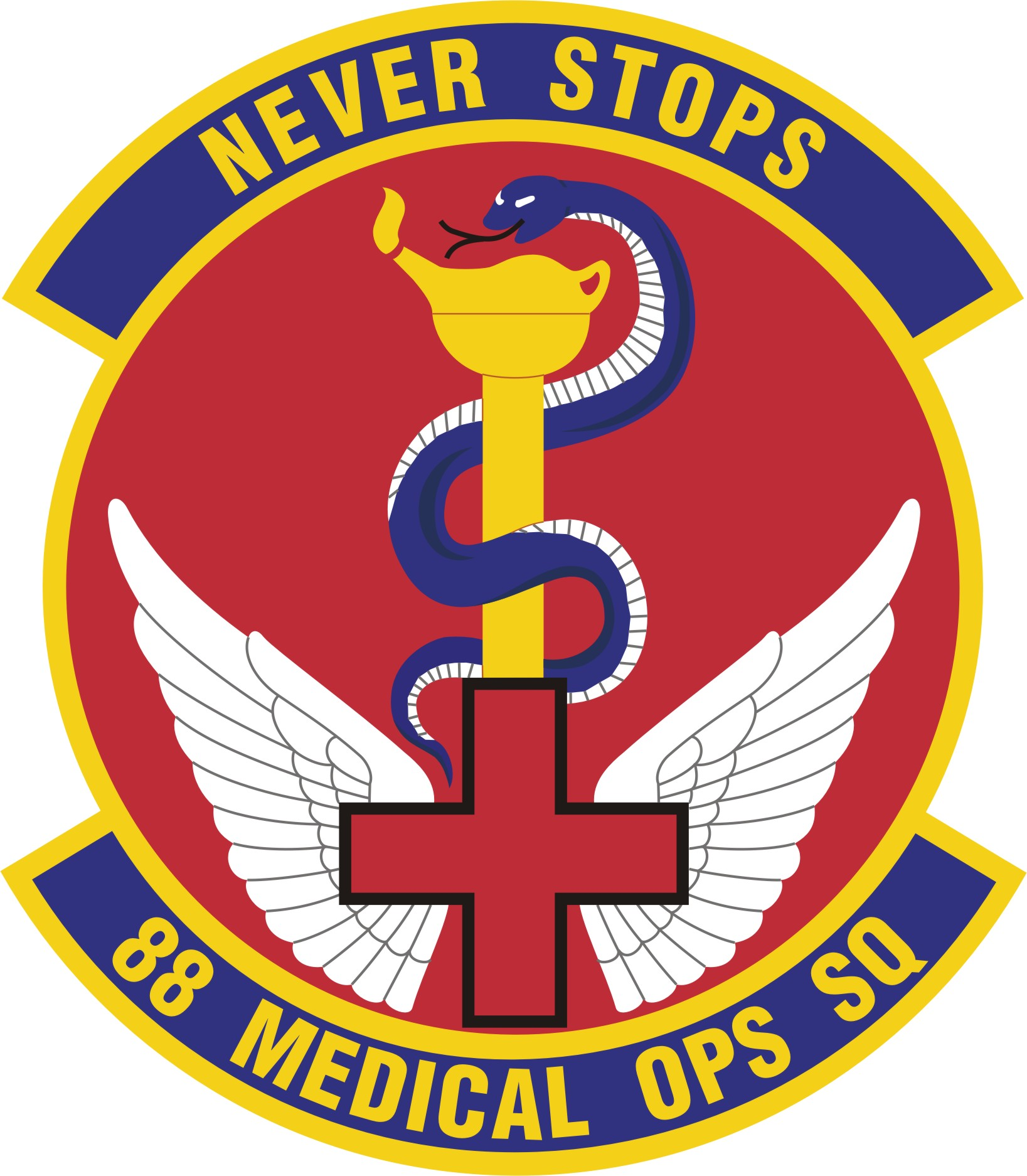
88th Medical Operations Squadron (redesignated as 88th Healthcare Operations Squadron on 30 Sept 2020)

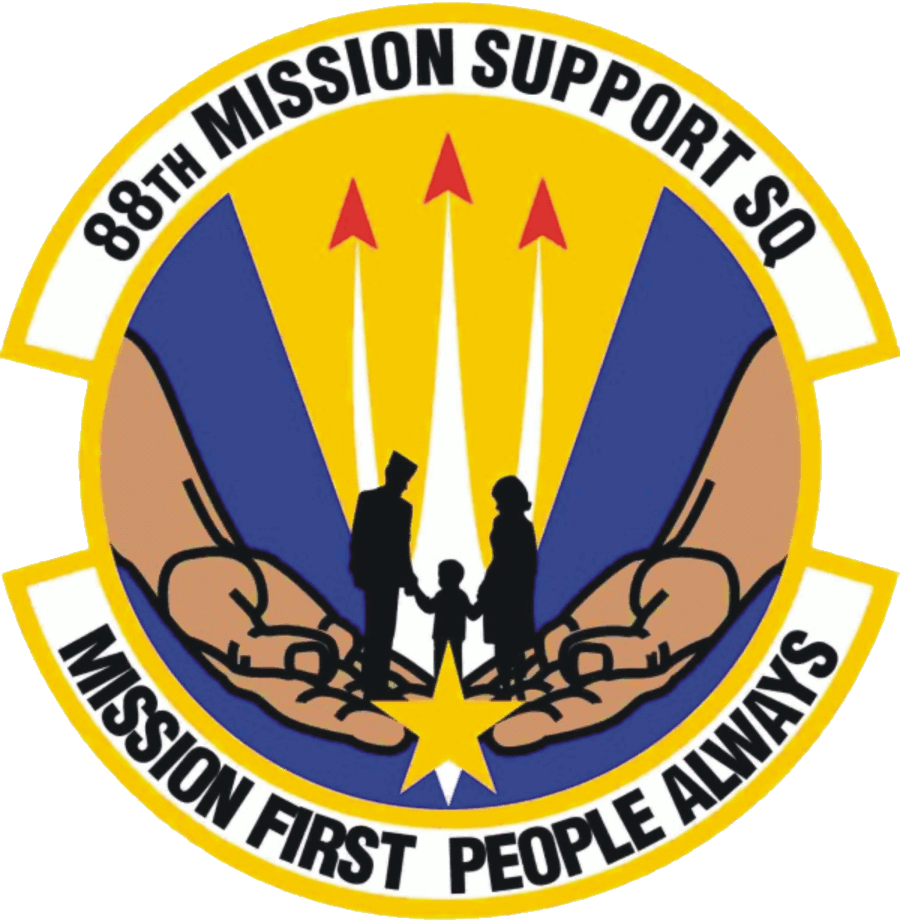
88th Mission Support Squadron (redesignated 88th Force Support Squadron on 25 Sept 2009)

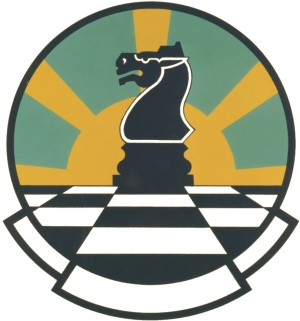
47th Airlift Flight (reallocated to 375th Airlift Wing on 1 July 1995)
