= Wright-Patterson Air Force Base =

United States Air Force base near Dayton, Ohio, United States

- Near Dayton, Ohio in United States
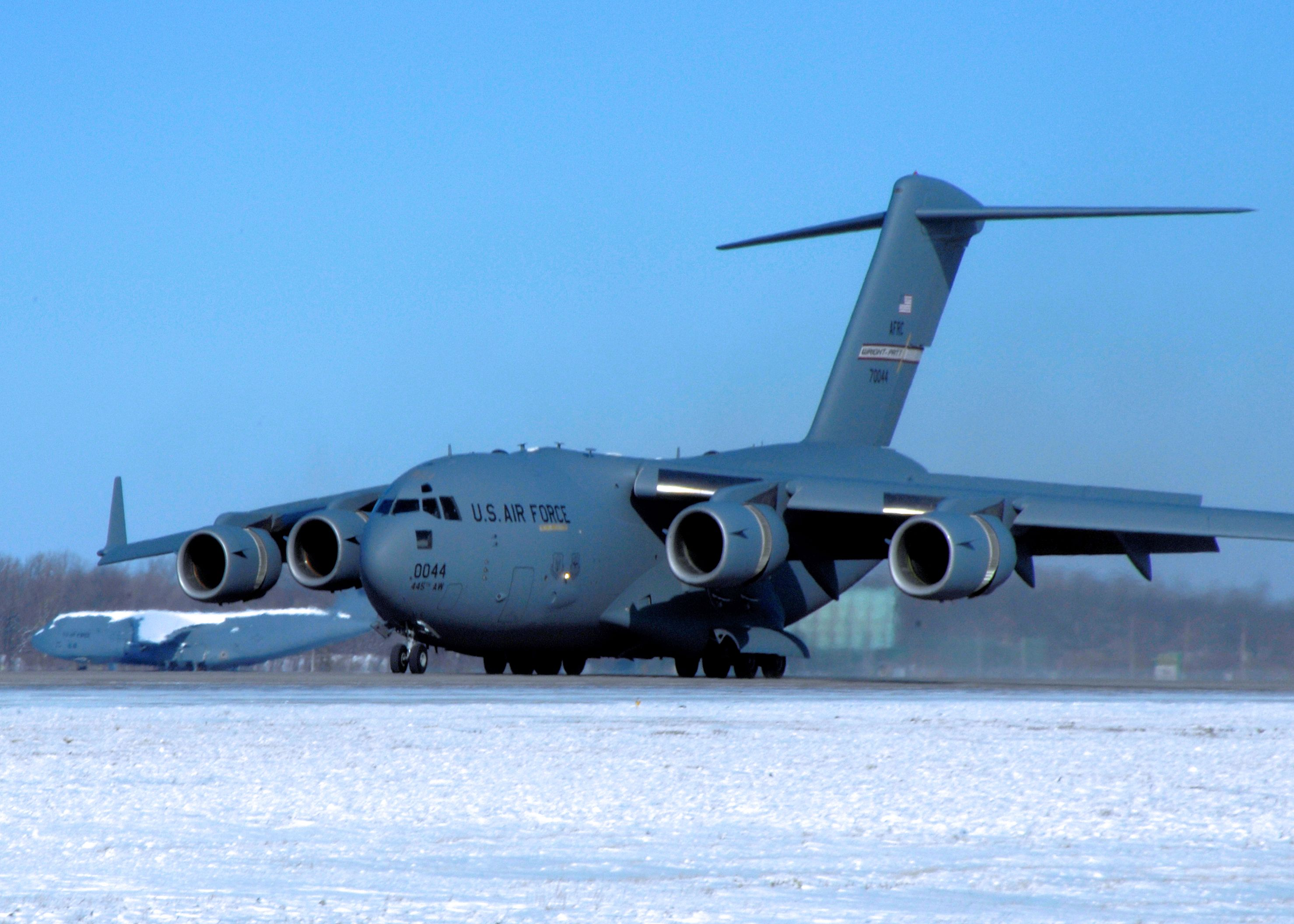
- A Boeing C-17A Globemaster III of the 445th Airlift Wing based at Wright-Patterson AFB

Site information
- Type: US Air Force Base
- Owner: Department of Defense
- Operator: US Air Force
- Controlled by: Air Force Materiel Command (AFMC)
- Condition: Operational
- Website: www.wpafb.af.mil

Location
- Location within Ohio Location within the United States
- Coordinates: 39°49′23″N 084°02′58″W

Site history
- Built: 1917
- In use: 1917 – present
- Events: Dayton Agreement (1995); US Air Force Marathon (1997 – present)

Garrison information
- Current commander: Colonel Dustin C. Richards
- Garrison: 88th Air Base Wing (Host)

Airfield information
- Identifiers: IATA: FFO, ICAO: KFFO, FAA LID: FFO, WMO: 745700
- Elevation: 250.8 metres (823 ft) AMSL
Runways
Direction	Length and surface
5L/23R	3,840.4 metres (12,600 ft) Porous European Mix
5R/23L	2,133.6 metres (7,000 ft) Asphalt

Wright-Patterson Air Force Base (WPAFB) (IATA: FFO, ICAO: KFFO, FAA LID: FFO) is a United States Air Force base and census-designated place just east of Dayton, Ohio, in Greene and Montgomery counties. It includes both Wright and Patterson Fields, which were originally Wilbur Wright Field and Fairfield Aviation General Supply Depot. Patterson Field is about 16 kilometres (10 mi) northeast of Dayton; Wright Field is about 8.0 kilometres (5 mi) northeast of Dayton.

The host unit at Wright-Patterson AFB is the 88th Air Base Wing (88 ABW), assigned to the Air Force Life Cycle Management Center and Air Force Materiel Command. The 88 ABW operates the airfield, maintains all infrastructure and provides security, communications, medical, legal, personnel, contracting, finance, transportation, air traffic control, weather forecasting, public affairs, recreation and chaplain services for more than 60 associate units. The Air Force's National Air and Space Intelligence Center (NASIC) and the Space Force's National Space Intelligence Center (NSIC) are also garrisoned there and are the Intelligence Community's primary organizations for strategic air and space threat analysis.

The base began with the establishment of Wilbur Wright Field on 22 May 1917 and McCook Field in November 1917, by the Aviation Section, U.S. Signal Corps as World War I installations. McCook was used as a testing field and for aviation experiments. Wright was used as a flying field (renamed Patterson Field in 1931); Fairfield Aviation General Supply Depot; armorers' school, and a temporary storage depot. McCook's functions were transferred to Wright Field when it was closed in October 1927. Wright-Patterson AFB was established in 1948 as a merger of Patterson and Wright Fields.

In 1995, negotiations to end the Bosnian War as part of the Yugoslav Wars were held at Wright-Patterson Air Force Base near Dayton, Ohio. The talks were hosted by the United States and involved the leaders of Bosnia and Herzegovina, Croatia, and Serbia. The negotiations produced the Dayton Agreement, which established Bosnia and Herzegovina as a single sovereign state composed of two entities and brought an end to more than three years of armed conflict.

The base had a total of 27,406 military, civilian and contract employees in 2010. The Greene County portion of the base is a census-designated place (CDP), with a resident population of 1,821 at the 2010 census.

== History ==
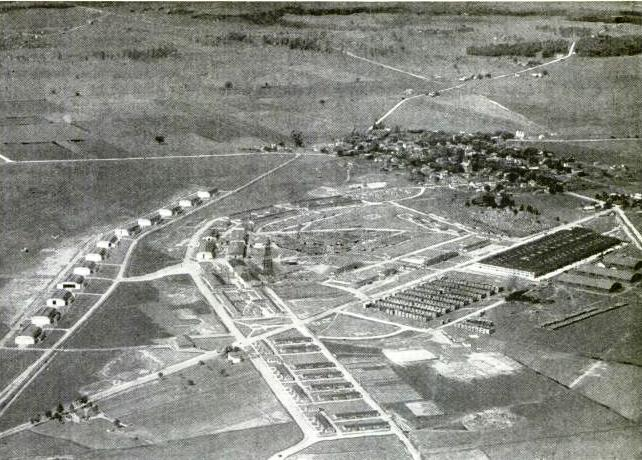
Wilbur Wright Field and Fairfield Air Depot, c. 1920

Prehistoric Indian mounds of the Adena culture at Wright-Patterson are along P Street and, at the Wright Brothers Memorial, a hilltop mound group.

Aircraft operations on land now part of Wright-Patterson Air Force Base began in 1904–1905 when Wilbur and Orville Wright used an 84-acre (340,000 m^{2}) plot of Huffman Prairie for experimental test flights with the Wright Flyer III. Their flight exhibition company and the Wright Company School of Aviation returned 1910–1916 to use the flying field.

World War I transfers of land that later became WPAFB include 2,075-acre (8.40 km^{2}) (including the Huffman Prairie Flying Field) along the Mad River leased to the Army by the Miami Conservancy District, the adjacent 40 acres (160,000 m^{2}) purchased by the Army from the District for the Fairfield Aviation General Supply Depot, and a 254-acre (1.03 km^{2}) complex for McCook Field just north of downtown Dayton between Keowee Street and the Great Miami River. In 1918, Wilbur Wright Field agreed to let McCook Field use hangar and shop space as well as its enlisted mechanics to assemble and maintain airplanes and engines under the direction of Chief of Air Service Mason Patrick.

After World War I, 347 German aircraft were brought to the United States—some were incorporated into the Army Aeronautical Museum (in 1923 the Engineering Division at McCook Field "first collected technical artifacts for preservation"). The training school at Wilbur Wright Field was discontinued. Wilbur Wright Field and the depot merged after World War I to form the Fairfield Air Depot. The Patterson family formed the Dayton Air Service Committee, Inc which held a campaign that raised $425,000 in two days and purchased 4,520.47 acres (18.2937 km^{2}) northeast of Dayton, including Wilbur Wright Field and the Huffman Prairie Flying Field.

In 1924, the committee presented the deeds to President Calvin Coolidge for the construction of a new aviation engineering center. The entire acreage (including the Fairfield Air Depot) was designated Wright Field, which had units such as the Headquarters, 5th Division Air Service (redesignated 5th Division Aviation in 1928), and its 88th Observation Squadron and 7th Photo Section. New facilities were built between 1925 and 1927 on the portion of Wright Field west of Huffman Dam to house all of the McCook Field functions being relocated.

Aeronautical achievements/developments
1919-09-18	"World altitude record (unofficial) of 28,899 ft. set by Maj. R. W. Schroeder (Bristol-300 Hispano) at Dayton, Ohio."
1919-10-04	Maj. R. W. Schroeder and Lt. G. E. Elfrey at Dayton set an "official world 2-man altitude record of 31,821 ft." in a Lepere airplane with a supercharged Liberty 400 engine.
1921-02-12	"First section of American "model" Airways route from Washington, D. C. to Dayton, Ohio, inaugurated."
1922-06-12	"24,206 ft. parachute jump made by Capt. A. W. Stevens from a Martin bomber piloted by Lt. L. Wade, at Dayton, Ohio."
1923-04-16,17	"Non-refueled world duration and distance records set by Lts. J. A. Macready and O. G. Kelly (Fokker T2-Liberty 375) at Dayton, Ohio, Duration 36:04:34. Distance: 2516.55 miles."
1923-08-22	"Initial flight of Barling bomber (6 Liberty 400 engines), largest airplane made in U. S., at [Wilbur] Wright Field, Dayton, Ohio. Pilot, Lt. H. R. Harris."
1924-10-2,3,4	"Air race winners at [Wilbur] Wright Field, Dayton, Ohio include: Liberty Engine Builders Trophy, Lt. D. G. Duke (DH4B-Liberty 400), speed 130.34 mph over 180-mile course; John L. Mitchell Trophy, Lt. C. Bettis (Curtiss PW8—D12HC Curtiss 460), speed 175.41 mph over 200 km course; Pulitzer Trophy Race, Lt. H. H. Mills (Verville Sperry—D12AHC Curtiss 520), speed 216.55 mph over 200 km course."
1927-10-12	"Wright Field, Dayton, Ohio, formally dedicated, and the Materiel Division moves from McCook Field to the new site. The John L. Mitchell Trophy Race won by Lt. I. A. Woodring, 1st Pursuit Group, during the ceremonies. Speed: 158.968 mph."
1928-03-10	$900,000 was authorized for completing the Wright Field experimental laboratory.
1928-06-16	Wright Field testing of "superchargers designed to give sea level pressure at 30,000 ft." and liquid oxygen breathing system.
1933-05-20	"First class of "instrument landing" fliers demonstrate expertness at Wright Field".

=== Wright and Patterson fields ===
Wright Field was "formally dedicated" on 12 October 1927 when "the Materiel Division moved from McCook Field to the new site" At the time of the dedication expenditures of approximately $5 million had been involved in the new facility after 18 months work, with the total amount expected to rise to between $7 and $8 million. The ceremonies included the John L. Mitchell Trophy Race (won by Lt. I. A. Woodring of the 1st Pursuit Group—Speed: 158.968 mph) and Orville Wright raising the flag over the new engineering center.

On 1 July 1931, the portion of Wright Field east of Huffman Dam (land known today as Areas A and C of Wright-Patterson Air Force Base which included the Fairfield Air Depot and the Huffman Prairie Flying Field) was redesignated "Patterson Field" in honor of Lieutenant Frank Stuart Patterson. Lt. Patterson was the son of Frank J. Patterson, co-founder of National Cash Register. Shortly before the end of World War I, First Lieutenant Patterson and observer Second Lieutenant LeRoy Swan, both of the 137th Aero Squadron, were killed at Wright Field in the crash of their de Havilland DH.4 after its wings collapsed during a dive while firing at ground targets with a new synchronized-through–the–propeller machine gun. Patterson's grave and memorial arch is at Woodland Cemetery and Aborateum in Dayton, Ohio.

=== World War II ===
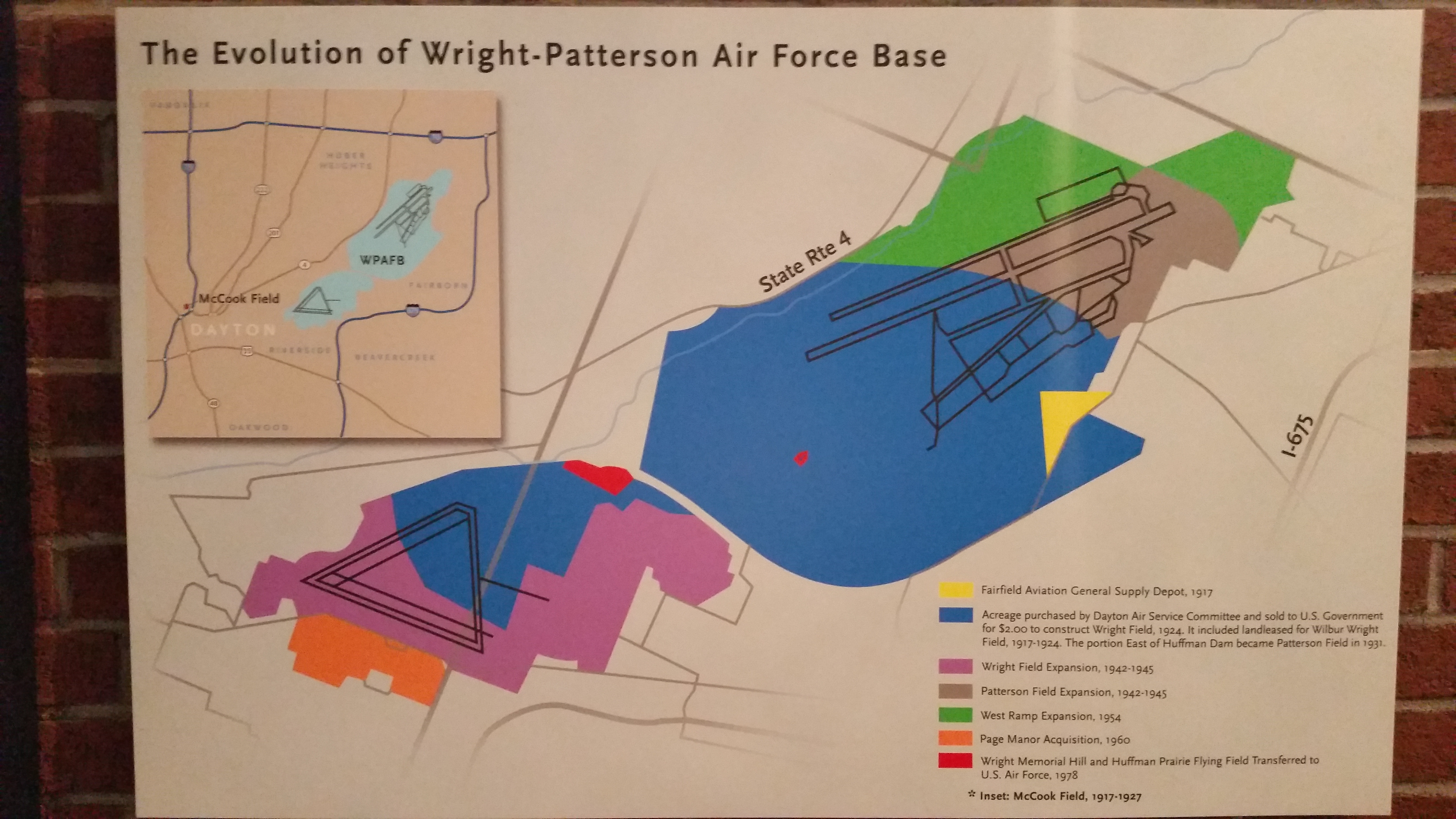
A National Park Service marker showing the historical growth of Wright-Patterson Air Force Base

The area's World War II Army Air Fields had employment increase from approximately 3,700 in December 1939 to over 50,000 at the war's peak. Wright Field grew from approximately 30 buildings to a 2,064-acre (8.35 km^{2}) facility with some 300 buildings and the Air Corps' first modern paved runways. The original part of the field became saturated with office and laboratory buildings and test facilities. The Hilltop area was acquired from private landowners in 1943–1944 to provide troop housing and services.

The portion of Patterson Field from Huffman Dam through the Brick Quarters (including the command headquarters in Building 10262) at the south end of Patterson Field along Route 4 was administratively reassigned from Patterson Field to Wright Field. To avoid confusing the two areas of Wright Field, the south end of the former Patterson Field portion was designated "Area A", the original Wright Field became "Area B", and the north end of Patterson Field, including the flying field, "Area C."

In February 1940 at Wright Field, the Army Air Corps established the Technical Data Branch (Technical Data Section in July 1941, Technical Data Laboratory in 1942). After Air Corps Ferrying Command was established on 29 May 1941, on 21 June an installation point of the command opened at Patterson Field. The Flight Test Training unit of Air Technical Command was established at Wright Field on 9 September 1944 (moved to Patterson Field in 1946, Edwards AFB on 4 February 1951).

Two densely populated housing and service areas across Highway 444, Wood City and Skyway Park, were geographically separated from the central core of Patterson Field and developed almost self-sufficient community status. (Wood City was acquired in 1924 as part of the original donation of land to the government but was used primarily as just a radio range until World War II. Skyway Park was acquired in 1943.) They supported the vast numbers of recruits who enlisted and were trained at the two fields as well as thousands of civilian laborers, especially single women recruited to work at the depot. Skyway Park was demolished after the war. Wood City was eventually transformed into Kittyhawk Center, the base's modern commercial and recreation center.

In the fall of 1942, the first twelve "Air Force" officers to receive ATI field collection training were assigned to Wright Field for training in the technical aspects of "crash" intelligence (RAF Squadron Leader Colley identified how to obtain information from equipment marking plates and squadron markings. In July 1944 during the Robot Blitz, Wright Field fired a reconstructed German pulse-jet engine (an entire V-1 flying bomb was "reversed engineered" [sic] by 8 September at Republic Aviation.)

The first German and Japanese aircraft arrived in 1943, and captured equipment soon filled six buildings, a large outdoor storage area, and part of a flight-line hangar for Technical Data Lab study (TDL closed its Army Aeronautical Museum). The World War II Operation Lusty returned 86 German aircraft to Wright Field for study, e.g., the Messerschmitt Me 262 jet fighter, while the post-war Operation Paperclip brought German scientists and technicians to Wright Field, e.g., Ernst R. G. Eckert (most of the scientists eventually went to work in the various Wright Field labs.)

=== UFO studies / sightings ===
Project Sign (Project Grudge in 1949, Project Blue Book in March 1952) was WPAFB's T-2 Intelligence investigations of unidentified flying objects (UFO) reports that began in July 1947. In 1951, the Air Technical Intelligence Center (ATIC) began analysis of crashed Soviet aircraft from the Korean war. In March 1952, ATIC established an Aerial Phenomena Group to study reported UFO sightings, including those in Washington, DC, in 1952. By 1969, the Foreign Technology Division (FTD) and its predecessor organizations had studied 12,618 reported sightings: 701 remained unexplained when the Air Force closed its UFO investigations, and a 1968 report concluded that "there seems to be no reason to attribute [the unexplained sightings] to an extraterrestrial source without much more convincing evidence."

The FTD sent all of its case files to the USAF Historical Research Center, which transferred them in 1976 to the National Archives and Records Service in Washington, DC, which became the permanent repository of the Project Sign/Grudge/Blue Book records. In a 1988 interview, Senator Barry Goldwater claimed he had asked Gen. Curtis LeMay for access to a secret UFO room at WPAFB and an angry LeMay said, "Not only can't you get into it but don't you ever mention it to me again."

=== Technical base ===
The Army Air Forces Technical Base (Air Force Technical Base before being designated a USAF base) was formed on 15 December 1945, under Brig Gen Joseph T. Morris, during the World War II drawdown by merging Wright Field, Patterson Field, Dayton Army Air Field, and—acquired by Wright Field for 1942 glider testing—Clinton Army Air Field. The Jamestown Radar Annex became a leased installation of the Technical Base in 1946, and the "custodial units at Dayton and Clinton County AAFlds were discontinued in 1946".

An 8000-foot concrete runway with 1000-foot runoffs at each end was built 1946–1947 in Area C to accommodate very heavy bombers, initially referred to locally as the "B-36 runway". The 1947 All-Altitude Speed Course at Vandalia became a detached installation of the Technical Base. After the USAF was created in September 1947, Morris' base headquarters was redesignated Headquarters, Air Force Technical Base, on 15 December 1947.

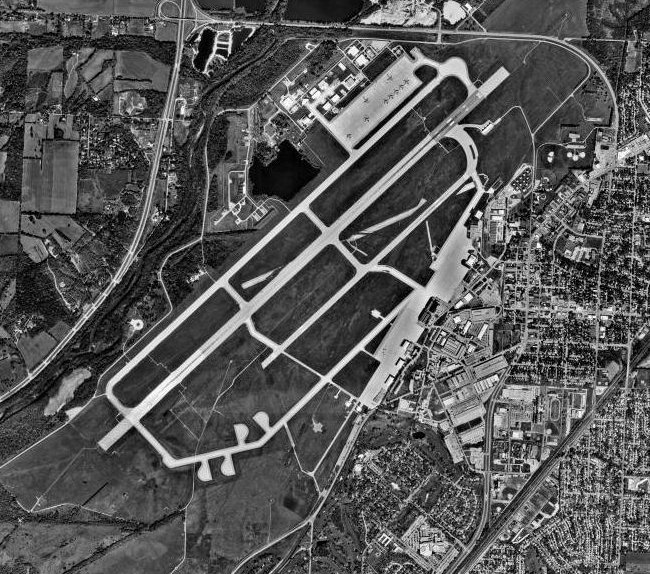
The WPAFB northern section in 2000

=== USAF base ===
Wright-Patterson Air Force Base was redesignated from the Air Force Technical Base on 13 January 1948—the former Wright Field Areas A and B remained, while Patterson Field became "Area C" and Skyway Park became "Area D" of the installation. In 1951, all locally based flying activities were moved to the Area B flight line. The 1948 All-Altitude Speed Course, later the Missile Tracking Annex, at Sulphur Grove, Ohio became a detached installation of Wright-Patt.

Headquarters, Air Engineering Development Division, was at WPAFB from 1 January 1950 to 14 November 1950, followed by the Air Research and Development Command from 16 November 1950 to 24 June 1951 (began move to Baltimore on 11 May 1951). By 1952 the WPAFB headquarters of the Wright Air Development Center (WADC) included a Plans and Operations Department (WOO) and Divisions for Aeronautics (WCN), Flight Test (WCT), Research (WCR), Weapons Components (WCE), Weapons Systems (WCS). On 15 February, WADC medical examinations "for the final selection of the Mercury astronauts were started" at the Aerospace Medical Laboratory (Wright-Patt test pilots Neil Armstrong and Ed White became NASA astronauts.)

From 6 March 1950 to 1 December 1951, Clinton County Air Force Base was assigned as a sub-base of WPAFB, and from 1950 to 1955, Wright-Patt had two Central Air Defense Force fighter-interceptor squadrons (1 from 1955 to 1960).

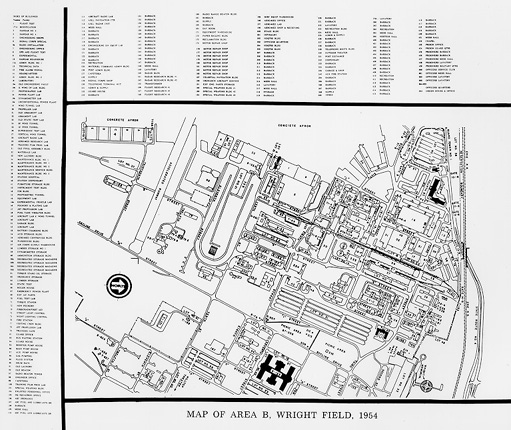
A 1954 base map

=== Cold War expansions ===
In 1954, 188 hectares (465 acres) of land adjacent to the Mad River at the northeast boundary of the base, near the former location of the village of Osborn, were purchased for a Strategic Air Command dispersal site. Area D structures were demolished in 1957 (donated to the state in 1963 for Wright State University). In February 1958 the Wright Field (Area B) runways were closed to all jet traffic (1959 Area C operations included 139,276 takeoffs and landings, Area B had 44,699.) The West Ramp complex was built between August 1958 and July 1960.

The 4043rd Strategic Wing began KC-135 Stratotanker operations in February 1960 and B-52 Stratofortress operations in June 1960. On 1 July 1963, the wing was re-designated the 17th Bombardment Wing (Heavy) and continued its mission under this unit until 7 July 1975, when the last of its 11 B-52s was transferred to Beale Air Force Base, California. From 1957–1962, WADC's Hurricane Supersonic Research Site in Utah was a detached installation of Wright-Patt.

The NORAD Manual Air Defense Control Center for 58th Air Division interceptors was at Wright-Patterson AFB by 1958, and Brookfield Air Force Station near the Pennsylvania state line became operational as an April 1952 – January 1963 sub-base of WPAFB. The 1954–79 "Wright-Patterson Communications Facility #4" was at Yellow Springs, Ohio (which also had the 1965–77 Celestial Guidance Research Site.)

WPAFB also had an Army Air Defense Command Post for nearby Project Nike surface-to-air missile sites of the Cincinnati-Dayton Defense Area were at Wilmington (CD-27, 39°24′03″N 083°52′54″W); Felicity (CD-46, 38°50′37″N 084°08′33″W); Dillsboro (CD-63), and Oxford (CD-78, 39°33′30″N 084°47′31″W). The AADCP activated in the spring of 1960 and moved to Wilmington—with BIRDIE CCCS—by 1965 (closed March 1971). Wilkins Air Force Station was a 1961–8 Air Defense Command station of Wright-Patt, and Gentile Air Force Station (later the Gentile Defense Electronics Supply Center) was assigned to the base on 1 July 1962.

In December 1975, Advanced Range Instrumentation Aircraft transferred to the 4950th Test Wing at WPAFB. Following the July 1992 merging of WPAFB labs, the base's Wright Laboratory included a Flight Dynamics Directorate. Superfund sites (39 initial areas) of WPAFB were found to be contaminated with chlorinated volatile organic compounds and benzene compounds (soils and groundwater), and an EPA/USAF Federal Facilities Agreement was signed in 1981 for remediation and continued investigation (the Installation Restoration Program for WPAFB identified 65 areas, including 13 landfills, 12 earth fill disposal zones, 9 fuel or chemical spill sites, 6 coal storage piles, 5 fire-training areas, 4 chemical burial sites, and 2 underground storage tanks). In November 1995, the "Dayton Peace Accords" held at WPAFB created the "Agreement for Peace in Bosnia and Herzegovina" signed in Paris on 14 December.

=== Huffman Prairie designation ===
Huffman Prairie was designated a National Historic Landmark in 1990 and named part of the 1992 Dayton Aviation Heritage National Historical Park. The West Ramp facility switched from the 4950th Test Wing to AFRC's 445th Airlift Wing with C-17 Globemaster III transports. The permanent party work force at WPAFB as of 30 September 2024, numbered 7,139 military and 15,642 civilian.

=== Dayton Agreement ===
In 1995, Alija Izetbegović, the President of Bosnia and Herzegovina; Franjo Tuđman, the President of Croatia; and Slobodan Milošević, the President of Serbia, arrived at Wright-Patterson AFB to commence negotiations to end the Bosnian War, an ethnic conflict that by 1995 was between the Bosnia and Herzegovina's Bosniaks and the Croats (who had put aside their differences) on one side versus Bosnia and Herzegovina's Serbs on the other side. American diplomat Richard Holbrooke led the negotiations. Eventually an agreement was made to have Bosnia and Herzegovina have two internal entities, a Bosniak-Croat federation known as the Federation of Bosnia and Herzegovina, and a Serb territory known as Republika Srpska.

Due to financial self-insufficiency, in 2013 the Air Force recommended that the base aero club be shut down. Despite efforts by the group's members to contest the decision, it was confirmed by the Air Force in June 2020.

=== 2019–22 coronavirus pandemic ===
In response to the COVID-19 pandemic, the base sent airmen from the 88th Medical Group to Detroit for two months, where they set up a COVID-19 vaccination site in support of the Federal Emergency Management whole-of-government COVID response. The base sent medical Air Force professionals to New York City after airmen from the 445th Airlift Wing were deployed to aid the city's response.

=== Assignments ===
Air Materiel Command, 9 March 1946
Air Force Logistics Command, 1 April 1961
Air Force Materiel Command, 1 July 1992

=== Units ===
In addition to the command headquarters, major units formerly assigned to Wright-Patterson Air Force Base include:

- Air Materiel Command Technical Intelligence Department, 10 October 1947 – 21 May 1951

Redesignated: Air Technical Intelligence Center, 21 May 1951 – 1 July 1961

- USAF Technical Intelligence School, 1 May 1953 – 1 July 1961
- 1702d Air Transport Group, 1 October 1948 – 17 July 1950
- 58th Air Division, 8 September 1955 – 1 February 1959
- 4043d Strategic Wing, 1 April 1959 – 1 February 1963
- 17th Bombardment Wing, 1 July 1963 – 30 September 1975

=== Museum ===
Located adjacent to the base proper is the National Museum of the United States Air Force. The oldest and largest military aircraft museum in the world, it houses such aircraft as the only XB-70 Valkyrie in existence, an F-117 Nighthawk stealth fighter, and the World War II B-17 bomber, Memphis Belle.

== Role and operations ==
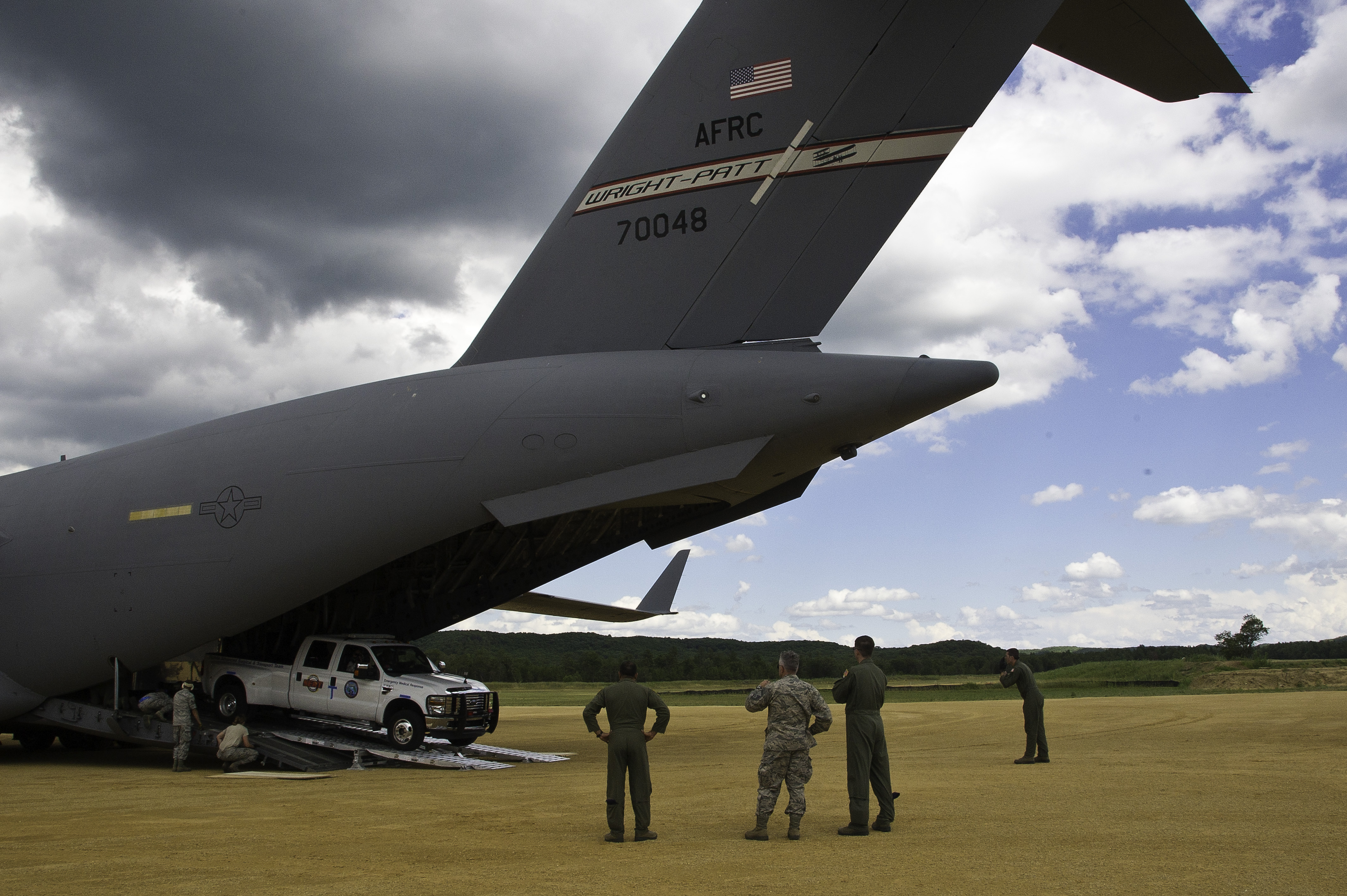
Equipment is unloaded from a C-17A Globemaster III of the 89th Airlift Squadron based at Wright-Patterson AFB.

Wright-Patterson AFB is "one of the largest, most diverse, and organizationally complex bases in the Air Force" with a long history of flight tests spanning from the Wright Brothers into the Space Age.

It is the headquarters of the Air Force Materiel Command, one of the major commands of the Air Force. "Wright-Patt" (as the base is colloquially called) is also the location of a major USAF Medical Center (hospital), the Air Force Institute of Technology, and the National Museum of the United States Air Force, formerly known as the U.S. Air Force Museum.

The 88th Air Base Wing consists of more than 5,000 officers, enlisted Air Force, civilian and contractor employees responsible for three primary mission areas: operating the installation; deploying expeditionary Airmen in support of the Global War on Terrorism; and defending the base and its people.

It is also the home base of the 445th Airlift Wing of the Air Force Reserve Command, an Air Mobility Command-gained unit which flies the C-17 Globemaster heavy airlifter. Wright-Patterson is also the headquarters of the Air Force Life Cycle Management Center and the Air Force Research Laboratory.

Wright-Patterson is the host of the annual United States Air Force Marathon which occurs the weekend closest to the Air Force's anniversary.

The base conducts neurotechnology research.

== Based units ==
Flying and notable non-flying units based at Wright-Patterson Air Force Base.

Units marked GSU are Geographically Separate Units, which although based at Wright-Patterson, are subordinate to a parent unit based at another location.

=== United States Air Force ===
Air Force Materiel Command (AFMC)

- Headquarters Air Force Materiel Command
- Air Force Life Cycle Management Center
  - Headquarters Air Force Life Cycle Management Center
  - 21st Intelligence Squadron
  - 645th Aeronautical Systems Group
  - Business & Enterprise Systems Directorate
    - Financial Systems Division (GSU)
  - Propulsion Directorate
    - Propulsion Acquisition Division (GSU)
  - Rapid Sustainment Directorate
  - Fighters & Advanced Aircraft Directorate
    - Advanced Aircraft Division
    - Special Programs Division
    - F-15 FMS Division
  - Bombers Directorate
    - Strike Systems Division
    - B-2 Spirit Division
  - Air Force Security Assistance & Cooperation Directorate
    - International Logistics Support Division
    - Global Facilities Support Division
    - Financial Management & Comptroller Division
    - International Division
    - Contract Execution Division
    - Central Division
    - Policy & Programs Division
    - Operations Division
    - Information Technology Services Division
  - Intelligence, Surveillance and Reconnaissance & Special Operations Forces Directorate
    - RQ-4 Global Hawk & U-2 Dragon Lady Division
    - Medium Altitude Unmanned Aerial Systems Division
    - Intelligence, Surveillance and Reconnaissance Sensors & FMS Division
    - Special Operations Forces & Personnel Recovery Division
    - Helicopter Program Office
    - Attack Systems Directorate
  - Joint Strike Fighter Directorate
  - Mobility & Training Aircraft Directorate
    - International Acquisition Programs Division
    - T-7 Division
    - KC-46 Division
  - Agile Combat Support Directorate
    - Portfolio Analysis Division
    - Foreign Military Sales Division
    - Simulators Division
    - Human Systems Division
  - Presidential & Executive Aircraft Directorate
    - VC-25B "Next Air Force One" Division
  - Acquisition Excellence Directorate
  - Personnel Directorate
  - Engineering Directorate
  - Judge Advocate Office
  - Financial Management Directorate
  - Information Protection Directorate
  - Logistics Directorate
  - Contracting Directorate
  - Plans & Programs Directorate
  - Small Business Office
  - Safety Office
  - Program Execution Directorate
    - Test & Evaluation Division
  - Personnel Execution Directorate
  - Technical Engineering Directorate
  - Architecture & Integration Directorate
  - Financial Management Mission Execution Directorate
  - Logistics Services Directorate
  - Contract Execution Directorate
  - Plans & Programs Execution Directorate
    - Center Information Technology Office
  - Intelligence Directorate
  - 88th Air Base Wing (Host wing)
    - Headquarters 88th Air Base Wing
    - United States Air Force Marathon Office
    - 88th Comptroller Squadron
    - 88th Operations Support Squadron
    - 88th Medical Group
      - 88th Inpatient Operations Squadron
      - 88th Dental Squadron
      - 88th Diagnostics and Therapeutics Squadron
      - 88th Healthcare Operations Squadron
      - 88th Surgical Operations Squadron
      - 88th Operational Medical Readiness Squadron
      - 88th Medical Support Squadron
    - 88th Civil Engineer Group
      - 88th Civil Engineer Squadron
      - 788th Civil Engineer Squadron
    - 88th Mission Support Group
      - 88th Communications Squadron
      - 88th Force Support Squadron
      - 88th Security Forces Squadron
      - 88th Logistics Readiness Squadron
- National Museum of the United States Air Force
- Air Force Installation and Mission Support Center
  - Detachment 6 (GSU)
  - Air Force Installation Contracting Center (GSU)
    - Acquisition Support Directorate
    - Contingency Contracting Directorate
    - Enterprise Solutions Support Directorate
    - Personnel & Resources Directorate
    - Resource Management Directorate
    - Small Business Directorate
    - 771st Enterprise Sourcing Squadron
- Air Force Research Laboratory
  - Headquarters Air Force Research Laboratory
  - 711th Human Performance Wing
    - Airman Systems Directorate
    - Human Systems Integration Directorate
    - US Air Force School of Aerospace Medicine
  - Air Force Research Laboratory D'Azzo Research Library
  - Air Vehicles Directorate
  - Materials and Manufacturing Directorate
  - Propulsion Directorate
  - Sensors Directorate

Air Education and Training Command (AETC)

- Air University
  - Detachment 1 (GSU)
  - Air Force Institute of Technology (GSU)
    - Mission Support Directorate
    - Communications & Information Directorate
    - Financial Management Directorate
    - Requirements, Plans & Programs Directorate
    - Safety Directorate
    - Security Directorate
    - Judge Advocate
    - The Civil Engineer School
    - Civilian Institution Programs
    - The Graduate School of Engineering & Management
    - The School of Strategic Force Studies
    - The School of Systems & Logistics
- Air Force Recruiting Service
  - 360th Recruiting Group
    - 338th Recruiting Squadron (GSU)

Air Mobility Command (AMC)

- 375th Air Mobility Wing
  - 375th Operations Group
    - Detachment 4 (GSU)

Air Combat Command (ACC)

- Sixteenth Air Force
  - 688th Cyberspace Wing
    - 690th Cyberspace Operations Group
      - 83rd Network Operations Squadron
        - Detachment 3 (GSU)
- First Air Force
  - Headquarters Civil Air Patrol-United States Air Force (HQ CAP-USAF)
    - Great Lakes Region Liaison Office (GSU)

Air Force District of Washington (AFDW)

- US Air Force Bands
  - The United States Air Force Band of Flight

Air Force Field Operating Agency (FOA)

- National Air and Space Intelligence Center
  - Directorate of Communications and Information
  - Directorate of Personnel
  - Directorate of Facilities and Logistics
  - Directorate of Plans and Operations
  - Air and Cyberspace Intelligence Group
    - Aircraft Analysis Squadron
    - Operational Requirements Squadron
    - Information Warfare Analysis Squadron
    - Integrated Command, Control, Communications, Computers Intelligence Surveillance and Reconnaissance Analysis Squadron
  - Geospatial and Signatures Intelligence Group
    - Persistent Infrared Analysis Squadron
    - Measurements and Signatures Intelligence Analysis Squadron
    - Geospatial Intelligence Analysis Squadron
  - Global Exploitation Intelligence Group
    - Regional Threats Analysis Squadron
    - Future Threats Analysis Squadron
    - Foreign Materiel Exploitation Squadron
    - Global Activities Squadron
    - Signals Analysis Squadron
  - Space, Missiles and Forces Intelligence Group
    - Ballistic Missile Analysis Squadron
    - Special Analysis Squadron
- Air Force Office of Special Investigations
  - 1st Field Investigations Region (GSU)
    - Headquarters 1st Field Investigations Region
    - Headquarters Operating Location Alpha
    - 10th Field Investigations Squadron
  - Procurement Fraud
    - Detachment 4 (GSU)
  - Special Projects
    - Headquarters Operating Location Charlie (GSU)
    - Detachment 2 (GSU)
- Air Force Legal Operations Agency
  - Air Force Claims Service Center (GSU)
- Air Force Audit Agency
  - Acquisition, Logistics, and Financial Management Directorate (GSU)
  - Field Activities Directorate
    - Operating Location Wright-Patterson (GSU)
- Air Force Manpower Analysis Agency
  - Operating Location Wright-Patterson (GSU)
- Air Force Personnel Center
  - Operating Location Wright-Patterson (GSU)
- Air Reserve Personnel Center
  - Headquarters Individual Reservist Readiness Integration Organization (HQ RIO)
    - Detachment 4
      - Operating Location Wright-Patterson (GSU)

Air Force Reserve Command (AFRC)

- Fourth Air Force
  - 445th Airlift Wing
    - Headquarters 445th Airlift Wing
    - 445th Aeromedical Staging Squadron
    - 445th Aerospace Medicine Squadron
    - 445th Operations Group
      - 89th Airlift Squadron – C-17A Globemaster III
      - 445th Aeromedical Evacuation Squadron
      - 445th Operations Support Squadron
    - 445th Maintenance Group
      - 445th Aircraft Maintenance Squadron
      - 445th Maintenance Squadron
    - 445th Mission Support Group
      - 87th Aerial Port Squadron
      - 445th Civil Engineer Squadron
      - 445th Communications Element
      - 445th Force Support Squadron
      - 445th Logistics Readiness Squadron
      - 445th Military Personnel Flight
      - 445th Security Forces Squadron
- Tenth Air Force
  - 655th Intelligence, Surveillance and Reconnaissance Wing
    - Headquarters 655th Intelligence, Surveillance and Reconnaissance Wing
    - 655th Intelligence, Surveillance and Reconnaissance Group
      - 14th Intelligence Squadron
      - 64th Intelligence Squadron
      - 71st Intelligence Squadron

Civil Air Patrol (CAP)

- Great Lakes Region
  - Ohio Wing
    - Group 7 (GSU)
      - Headquarters Group 7
      - Wright Patterson Composite Squadron

=== United States Space Force ===
Space Operations Command (SpOC)

- Space Delta 7
  - 73rd Intelligence, Surveillance and Reconnaissance Squadron (GSU)
  - 76th Intelligence, Surveillance and Reconnaissance Squadron (GSU)
- National Space Intelligence Center
  - 1st Space Analysis Squadron
  - 2nd Space Analysis Squadron

=== United States Army ===
United States Army Reserve (USAR)

- Military Intelligence Readiness Command
  - National Intelligence Support Group
    - 2100th Military Intelligence Group (GSU)

=== United States Marine Corps ===
Marine Forces Reserve (MARFORRES)

- Force Headquarters Group
  - 4th Law Enforcement Battalion
    - Military Police Company Charlie (GSU)

=== United States Department of the Navy ===
Bureau of Medicine and Surgery (BUMED)

- Naval Medical Research Center
  - Naval Medical Research Unit Dayton (GSU)

=== Department of Defense ===
Defense Security Cooperation University (DSCU)

- Defense Institute of Security Cooperation Studies

Defense Logistics Agency (DLA)

- Defense Automated Addressing System

== Geography ==
Wright-Patterson Air Force Base includes Area A (former Patterson Field and Wood City area) and Area B (former Wright Field). The USGS Geographic Names Information System separately designates the military installation, the airport, and the census-designated place (CDP). The CDP area, entirely in Greene County, primarily in Bath Township and extending south into Beavercreek Township, is 10.0 square miles (25.9 km^{2}), with 0.1 square miles (0.2 km^{2}) of it (0.80%) being water. The southwest end of the base, now the National Museum of the United States Air Force, is within the city of Riverside in Montgomery County.

== Demographics ==
In 2010, Wright-Patt had a total of 27,406 military, civilian and contract employees. As of the census of 2000, there were 6,656 people, 1,754 households, and 1,704 families residing on the base. The population density was 219.8/km^{2} (569.2/sq mi). There were 2,096 housing units at an average density of 69.2/km^{2} (179.2/sq mi). The racial makeup of the base was 76.11% White, 15.25% Black or African American, 0.45% Native American, 2.30% Asian, 0.12% Pacific Islander, 2.09% from other races, and 3.68% from two or more races. Hispanic or Latino of any race were 4.45% of the population.

There were 1,754 households, out of which 78.1% had children under the age of 18 living with them, 89.0% were married couples living together, 6.1% had a female householder with no husband present, and 2.8% were non-families. 2.6% of all households were made up of individuals, and none had someone living alone who was 65 years of age or older. The average household size was 3.60 and the average family size was 3.64.

On the base the population was spread out, with 42.5% under the age of 18, 11.6% from 18 to 24, 41.5% from 25 to 44, 4.2% from 45 to 64, and 0.2% who were 65 years of age or older. The median age was 23 years. For every 100 females there were 105.2 males. For every 100 females age 18 and over, there were 104.1 males.

The median income for a household on the base was $43,342, and the median income for a family was $43,092. Males had a median income of $30,888 versus $21,044 for females. The per capita income for the base was $15,341. About 1.6% of families and 1.8% of the population were below the poverty line, including 2.4% of those under age 18 and none of those age 65 or over.

As of 30 September 2009, Wright-Patterson had base housing amounting to 100 single-family units, 1,536 individual units, 408 units for unaccompanied enlisted personnel, and 468 visitor or temporary living units.

== Environmental problems ==
In May 2016, the Ohio Environmental Protection Agency ordered a drinking water well on the base to be shut down because of water contamination with perfluorooctane sulfonate (PFOS), a persistent chemical used in firefighting foam. April 2016 water samples from two wells showed 110 parts per trillion of PFOS, which is above the new EPA lifetime threshold of 70 parts per trillion. In June 2016, the EPA asked the base commander to speedily clean up the wells to prevent the contaminants from reaching more wells on base and Dayton's seven drinking water wells at Huffman Dam. Base officials stated in June 2020 that the on-base ground water tests confirmed that current PFOS contamination is below EPA required levels, a claim the City of Dayton disputes.

== In popular culture ==
Hangar 18 in Area B is purported to be the repository of a crashed UFO from Roswell, New Mexico and UFO research in general.

== Notable people ==
- Donald Ewart, electrical engineer
- Paul Fitts, psychologist and pioneer of human factors engineering
- Marcus Freeman, football player and coach, born on the base
- Steve Hertz, baseball player and coach, born on the base
- Mike Pelfrey, baseball player, born on the base
