= 659th Intelligence, Surveillance and Reconnaissance Group =

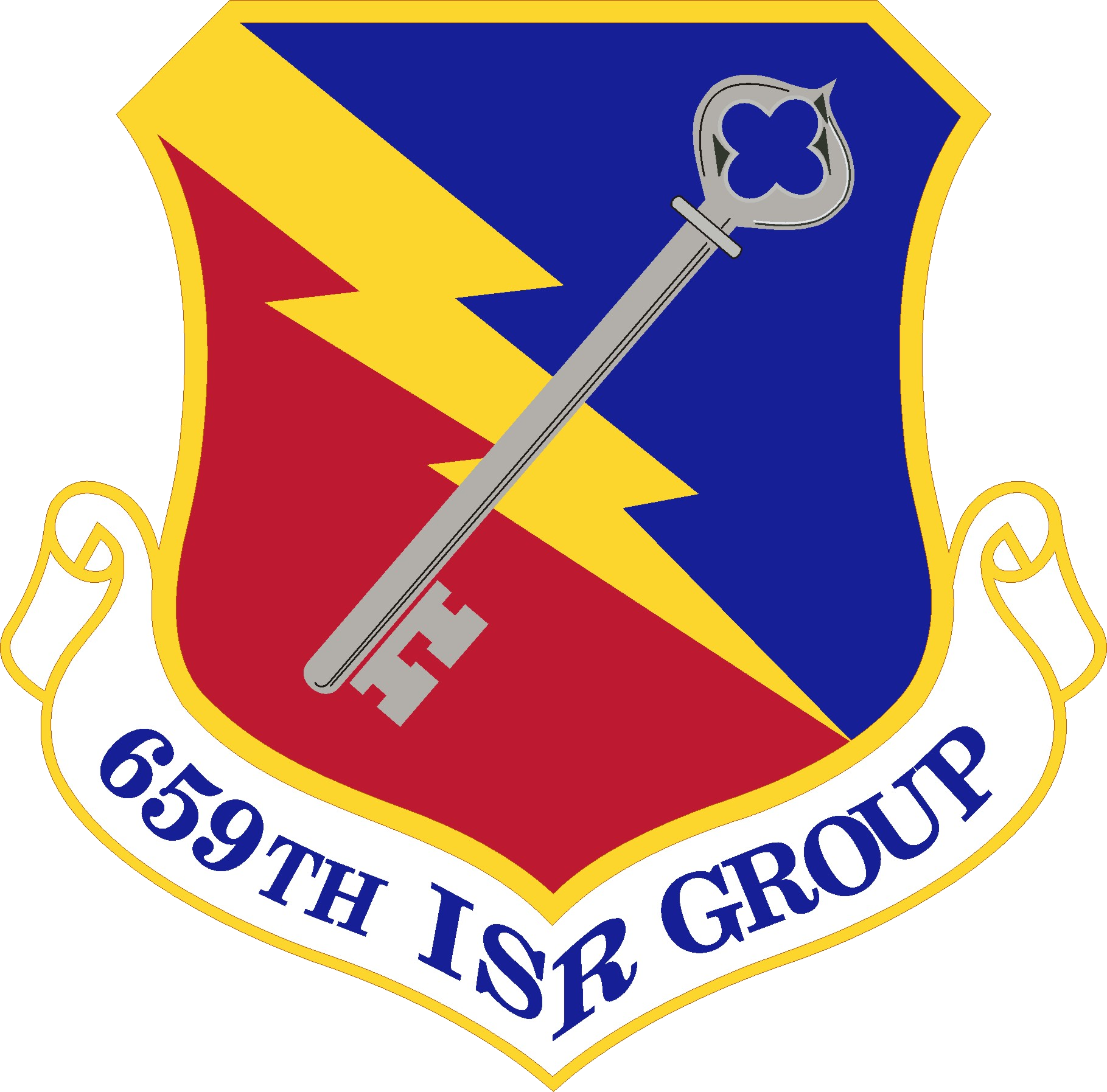
- Group emblem
- Active: 2010 – present
- Country: United States
- Branch: United States Air Force
- Type: Dependant group
- Role: Digital network intelligence, exploitation and analysis
- Part of: 70th Intelligence, Surveillance and Reconnaissance Wing
- Headquarters: Fort George G. Meade, Maryland
- Decorations: Air Force Outstanding Unit Award

The United States Air Force's 659th Intelligence, Surveillance and Reconnaissance Group (659 ISRG) is an intelligence unit located at Fort George G. Meade, Maryland.

== Mission ==
The mission of the 659 ISRG is to provide direct ISR support to the Sixteenth Air Force, which contributes to United States Cyber Command's mission. Squadron personnel focus on digital network exploitation analysis and digital network intelligence, and provide support to the National Security Agency.

== History ==
The Air Force activated the 770th ISR Group (P) as a provisional group in October 2009 to evaluate providing ISR support to the Twenty-Fourth Air Force. The 770th ISR Group (P) was inactivated with the activation of the 659 ISRG.

== Assignments ==
=== Major Command ===
- Air Combat Command (29 Sep 2014–present)

=== Numbered Air Force/Field Operating Agency ===
- Air Force Intelligence, Surveillance and Reconnaissance Agency (8 Sep 2010 – 28 Sep 2014)
- 25th Air Force (29 Sep 2014 – 10 Oct 2019)
- 16th Air Force (11 Oct 2019 – present)

=== Wings/Groups ===
- 70th ISR Wing (8 Sep 2010 – present)

== Squadrons assigned ==
- 5th Intelligence Squadron - Fort Gordon, GA
- 7th Intelligence Squadron - Fort George G. Meade, MD
- 35th Intelligence Squadron - Joint Base San Antonio-Lackand, TX
- 37th Intelligence Squadron - Joint Base Pearl Harbor–Hickam, HI

== Bases stationed ==
- Fort George G. Meade, MD (8 Sep 2010 – present)
