= 70th Intelligence, Surveillance and Reconnaissance Wing =

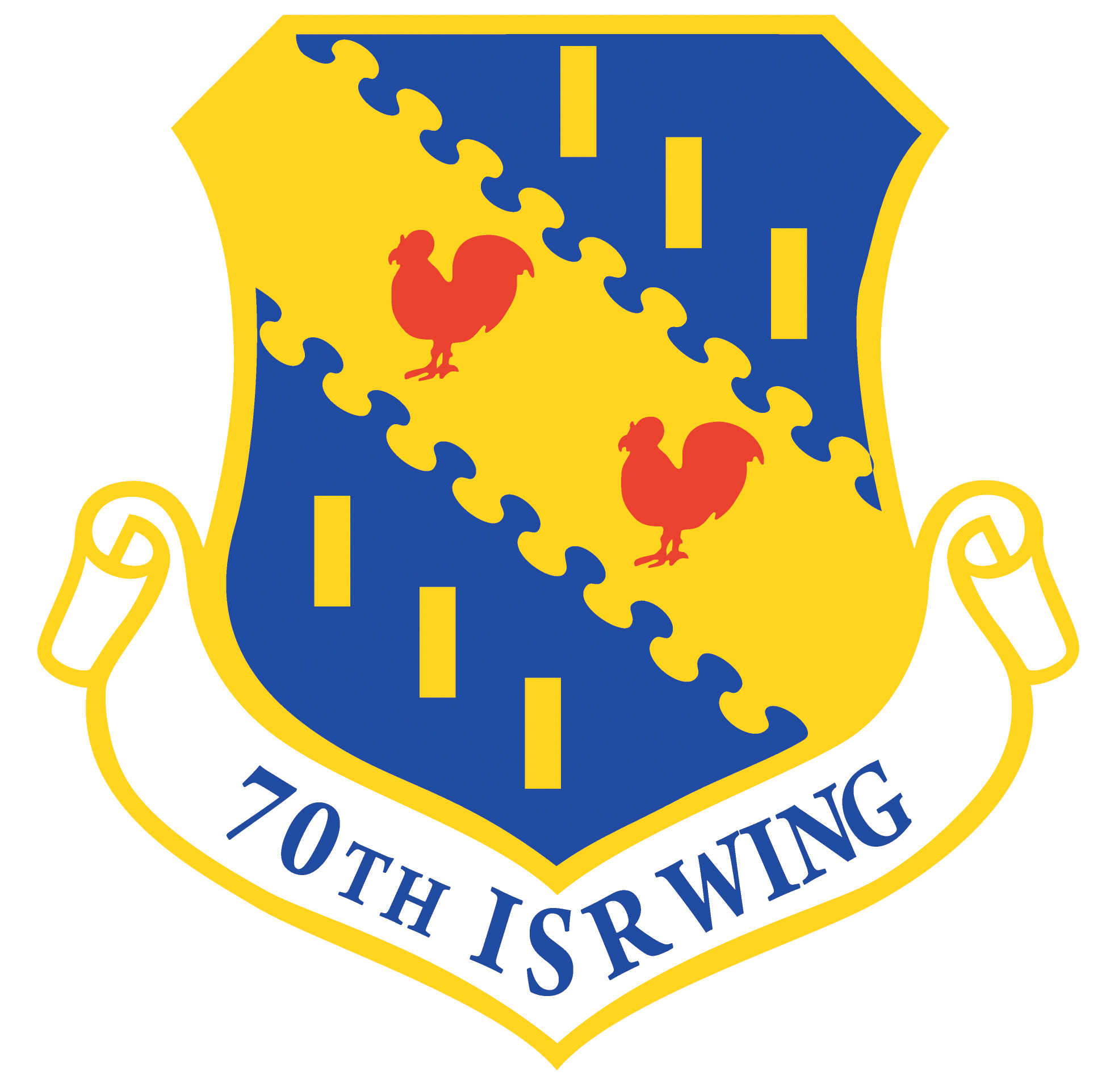
- Wing emblem
- Active: 1941–1943; 1947–1949; 1955–1962; 1963–1969; 1994–1998; 2000 – present
- Country: United States
- Branch: United States Air Force
- Type: Specialized mission wing
- Role: Intelligence and cryptologic operations
- Size: 6,200 personnel
- Part of: Air Combat Command (Sixteenth Air Force)
- Headquarters: Fort George G. Meade, Maryland
- Nicknames: America's Cryptologic Wing; Roosters
- Mottos: We watch out for you (World War II); Strength through unity (1964 – present)
- Decorations: Air Force Outstanding Unit Award
- Website: Official website

Commanders
- Current commander: Colonel Charles L. Carter

The 70th Intelligence, Surveillance and Reconnaissance Wing is a United States Air Force unit assigned to the 16th Air Force. It is stationed at Fort George G. Meade, Maryland.

Known as "America's Cryptologic Wing", is the only Air Force wing that supports the National Security Agency, the Sixteenth Air Force, and the entire United States Air Force with cryptologic intelligence.

The 70th Reconnaissance Group conducted observation, artillery adjustment and fighter and bomber support training with United States Army ground forces during World War II. The group served as a reserve unit for two years later in the decade. During the Cold War, the 70th was a component wing of Strategic Air Command's (SAC) deterrent force as a strategic reconnaissance organization and heavy bombardment wing.

== Mission ==
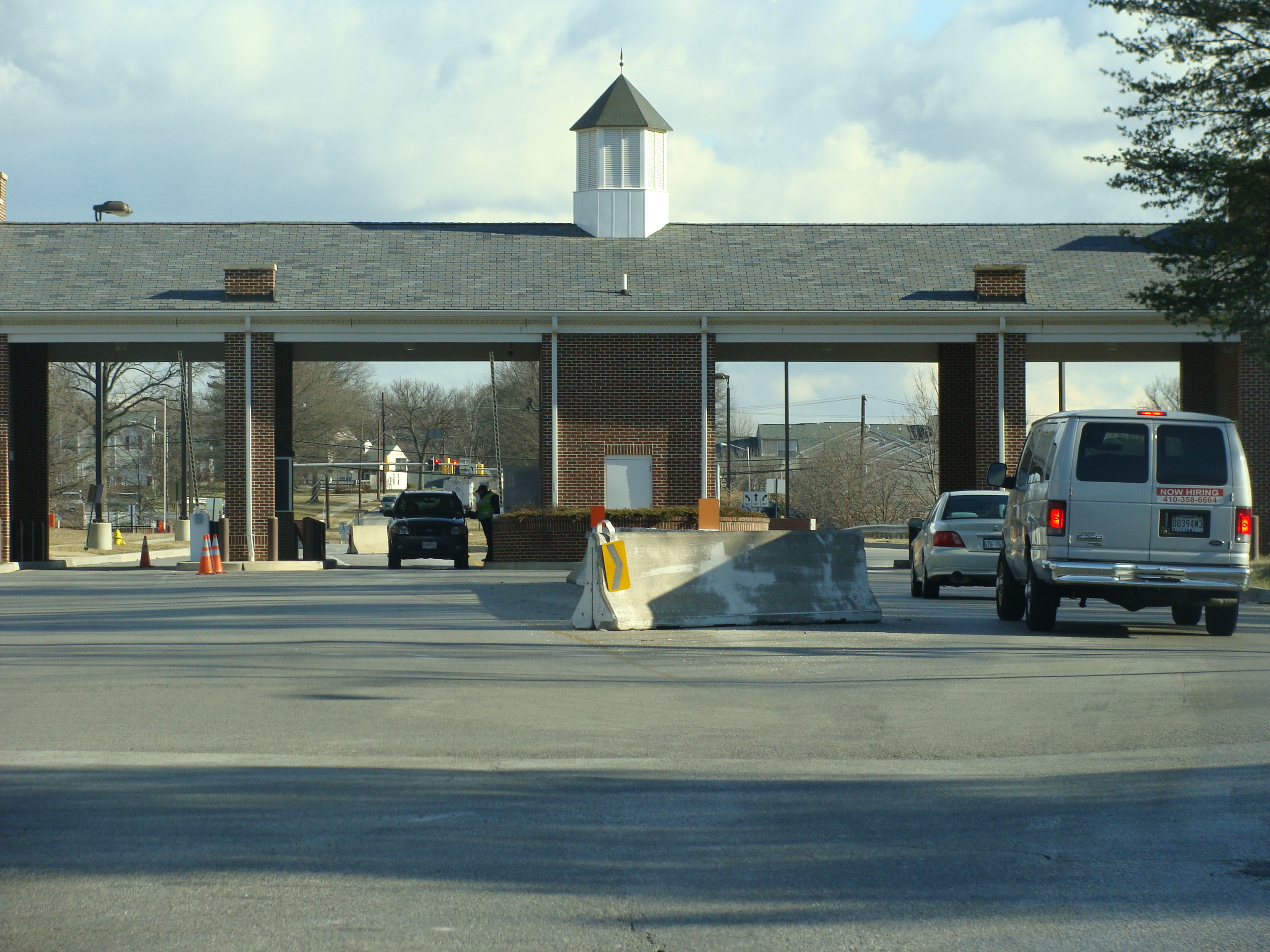
The main entrance to Fort George G. Meade, home of the 70th ISR Wing.

The wing's mission is to provide multi-source, multi-service intelligence products for the Department of Defense by gaining and exploiting information as a major component of the Air Force and DoD global intelligence mission. It trains and equips cryptologic and information operations specialists to carry out Air Force ISR Agency and National Security Agency joint-service operations.

The wing has six groups, 19 squadrons, 10 detachments and 26 operating locations spanning four continents. The wing falls under the Sixteenth Air Force at Lackland Air Force Base, Texas.

543d Intelligence, Surveillance and Reconnaissance Group is based at the Medina Annex, Lackland Air Force Base, Texas. A unique group within the wing. Organized according to mission, rather than by geography, the 543rd ISR Group has two squadrons within the United States that are part of Regional Signals Intelligence (SIGINT) Operations Centers. Providing command and control, personnel, communications, computer and logistics support for all Regional SIGINT Operations Centers conducting information operations, the 543rd ISR Group provides timely and accurate multi-regional SIGINT to warfighters and other intelligence users.

== Component units ==
Unless otherwise indicated, units are based at Fort George G. Meade, Maryland, and subordinate units are located at the same location as their commanding group.

Wing Staff

- 70th Operations Support Squadron

373rd Intelligence, Surveillance, and Reconnaissance Group (Joint Base Elmendorf-Richardson, Alaska)

- 301st Intelligence Squadron
- 381st Intelligence Squadron
- Detachment 1 (Yokota Air Base, Japan)

543rd Intelligence, Surveillance, and Reconnaissance Group (Joint Base San Antonio-Lackland, Texas)

- 93rd Intelligence Squadron
- 531st Intelligence Support Squadron
- 668th Alteration and Installation Squadron

544th Intelligence, Surveillance, and Reconnaissance Group (Buckley Space Force Base, Colorado)

- 18th Intelligence Squadron
- 26th Intelligence Squadron
- 566th Intelligence Squadron

659th Intelligence, Surveillance, and Reconnaissance Group

- 5th Intelligence Squadron (Fort Gordon, Georgia)
- 7th Intelligence Squadron
- 35th Intelligence Squadron (Joint Base San Antonio-Lackland, Texas)
- 37th Intelligence Squadron (Joint Base Pearl Harbor-Hickam, Hawaii)
- 41st Intelligence Squadron
- 75th Intelligence Squadron (Joint Base San Antonio-Lackland, Texas)

691st Intelligence, Surveillance, and Reconnaissance Group

- 22nd Intelligence Squadron
- 29th Intelligence Squadron
- 34th Intelligence Squadron

707th Intelligence, Surveillance, and Reconnaissance Group

- 32nd Intelligence Squadron
- 94th Intelligence Squadron
- 707th Communications Squadron
- 707th Force Support Squadron

== History ==
The 70th ISR Wing has its origins in the World War II 70th Reconnaissance Group, which was activated at Gray Army Airfield in September 1941. The 70th Reconnaissance Group was originally a Fourth Air Force training unit in observation and artillery adjustment, supporting Army ground units at Fort Lewis. After the Pearl Harbor Attack, the unit began antisubmarine patrols along the Pacific Coast, and provided support to II Bomber Command heavy bomber training units. It was largely unmanned after August 1943 when the United States Navy took over antisubmarine duty.

The group moved to Will Rogers Field, Oklahoma under Third Air Force in November 1943, and was programmed for training as a photo-reconnaissance unit, but the unit was never manned or equipped and was inactivated 30 November 1943.

The group was reactivated as part of the Air Force Reserve in 1947 as a reconnaissance group at Hill Air Force Base, Utah. It was assigned to Fourth Air Force, but it is unclear whether or not the unit had any assigned aircraft or personnel. It was inactivated in 1949 when Continental Air Command converted its reserve units to the Wing-Base organizational system (Hobson Plan).

=== Strategic Reconnaissance ===
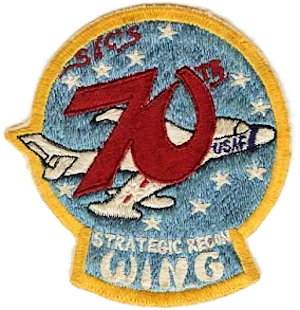
70th Strategic Reconnaissance Wing patch (unofficial)

The 70th Strategic Reconnaissance Wing was established by SAC on 23 March 1953, at Little Rock Air Force Base, Arkansas. However, Little Rock AFB was still under construction at the time, so the unit was temporarily stationed at Lockbourne Air Force Base, Ohio until October. Few wing components were manned until October when Little Rock was ready for operational use.

The 70th SRW's mission was to gather intelligence on a global scale as part of the strategic reconnaissance force of SAC. Equipped with Boeing RB-47E Stratojets, the wing conducted a variety of spectacular overflights of the Soviet Union during the 1950s, including overflying Murmansk. RB-47s had a fairly low operational ceiling of 40,000 feet and relied on speed, as opposed to altitude, to evade interception. Some of these flights were mounted from Thule, Greenland, and probed deep into the heart of the Soviet Union, taking a photographic and radar recording of the route attacking SAC bombers would follow to reach their targets. The risks involved in mounting these dangerous sorties speaks volumes for the courage and skill of the crews involved. Flights that involved penetrating mainland Russia were termed SENSINT (Sensitive Intelligence) missions. One RB-47 even managed to fly 450 miles inland and photograph the city of Igarka in Siberia.

The 70th SRW also assumed an air refueling mission in 1955 and was deployed at Sidi Slimane Air Base, Morocco, from 26 October to 17 December 1956.

Beginning in February 1958, operations with the RB-47 were reduced, primarily as the aircraft was determined to be vulnerable to Soviet air defenses, but also its mission was being taken over by the Lockheed U-2. From June 1958 to September 1961, the wing became a B-47 bombardment and reconnaissance organization, providing B/RB-47 combat crew training for other SAC units, while undertaking RB-47 and Boeing KC-97 Stratofreighter operations. The refueling squadron transferred in August 1961, and the final RB-47 class graduated in October 1961. It converted to B-47s in late 1961 but inactivated prior to becoming combat ready.

=== Strategic bombardment ===
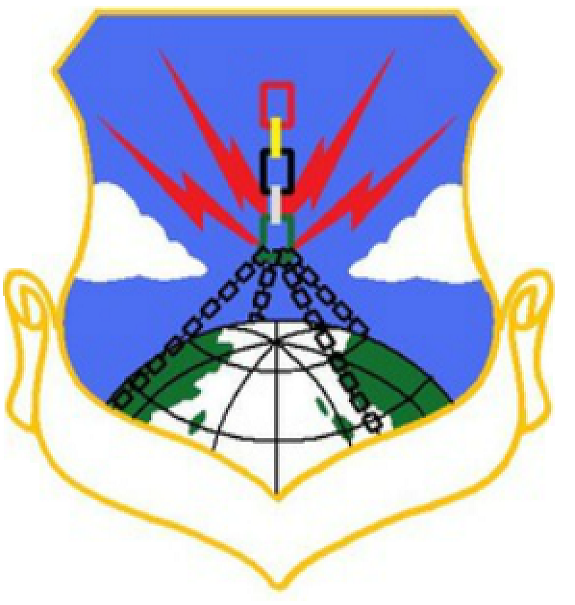
4123rd Strategic Wing emblem

4123d Strategic Wing On 10 December 1957, SAC established the 4123d Strategic Wing (SW) at Carswell Air Force BaseTexas and assigned it to the 19th Air Division. The wing was assigned the 4123d Air Base Squadron, which had been the host unit at Clinton-Sherman Air Force Base, Oklahoma since July 1955, preparing Clinton-Sherman, a former World War II Naval Air Station, to receive operational SAC aircraft plus the 98th Bombardment Squadron (BS), consisting of 15 Boeing B-52 Stratofortresses, which had been one of the three squadrons of the 7th Bombardment Wing and a maintenance squadron at Carswell. The air base squadron was expanded into the 4123d Air Base Group and assigned component squadrons on 1 July 1958.

At the end of 1958, the wing's first operational squadron, the 902d Air Refueling Squadron, flying Boeing KC-135 Stratotankers, was activated at Clinton-Sherman and the wing moved its headquarters to the base on 25 February 1959 and was reassigned to the 816th Air Division at the beginning of March. Within a week the 98th Bombardment Squadron joined the wing at Clinton-Sherman as part of SAC's plan to disperse its Boeing B-52 Stratofortress heavy bombers over a larger number of bases, thus making it more difficult for the Soviet Union to knock out the entire fleet with a surprise first strike. The same month, the 55th Aviation Depot Squadron was activated to oversee the wing's special weapons. Starting in 1960, one third of the wing's aircraft were maintained on fifteen-minute alert, fully fueled, armed and ready for combat to reduce vulnerability to a Soviet missile strike. This was increased to half the wing's aircraft in 1962. The 4123d (and later the 70th) continued to maintain an alert commitment until inactivation. In 1962, the wing's bombers began to be equipped with the GAM-77 Hound Dog and the GAM-72 Quail air-launched cruise missiles, The 4123d Airborne Missile Maintenance Squadron was activated in November to maintain these missiles

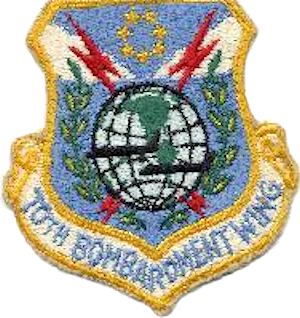
70th Bombardment Wing Patch

70th Bombardment Wing In 1962, in order to perpetuate the lineage of many currently inactive bombardment units with illustrious World War II records, Headquarters SAC received authority from Headquarters USAF to discontinue its Major Command controlled (MAJCON) strategic wings that were equipped with combat aircraft and to activate Air Force controlled (AFCON) units, most of which were inactive at the time which could carry a lineage and history. (Note: MAJCON units could not carry a permanent history or lineage. Ravenstein, Guide to Air Force Lineage, p. 12.) As a result, the 4123d SW was replaced by the newly redesignated 70th Bombardment Wing, Heavy, which assumed its mission, personnel, and equipment on 1 February 1963. (Note: The 70th Wing continued, through temporary bestowal, the history, and honors of the World War II 70th Reconnaissance Group. It was also entitled to retain the honors (but not the history or lineage) of the 4123d. This temporary bestowal ended in January 1984, when the wing and group were consolidated into a single unit.)

In the same way the 6th Bombardment Squadron, one of the unit's B-47 reconnaissance squadrons, replaced the 98th. The 857th Medical Group, 55th Munitions Maintenance Squadron and the 902d Air Refueling Squadron were reassigned to the 70th. The 4123d's maintenance and support units were replaced by units with numerical designation of the newly established wing. Under the Dual Deputate organization, all flying and maintenance squadrons were directly assigned to the wing, so no operational group element was activated. Each of the new units assumed the personnel, equipment, and mission of its predecessor.

The wing conducted strategic bombardment training and air refueling missions from February 1963 to December 1969. It was upgraded to the B-52D in 1968 by SAC along with receiving some older B-52Cs, which had limited use for training new aircrews. For several months in both 1968 and 1969, all of the 70th BW aircraft, most of the aircrew and maintenance personnel and some of its support people were loaned to other SAC units engaged in combat operations in the Far East and Southeast Asia. It was one of 11 SAC bomb wings that rotated such combat duty under the program known as Arc Light.

By 1969, Intercontinental ballistic missiles had been deployed and become operational as part of the United States' strategic triad, and the need for B-52s had been reduced. In addition, funds were also needed to cover the costs of combat operations in Indochina. The 70th Bombardment Wing was inactivated 31 December 1969, and its aircraft were reassigned to other SAC units. As part of the inactivation, Clinton-Sherman was closed.

=== Modern era ===
The wing was redesignated the 70th Air Base Group and operated and maintained Brooks Air Force Base, Texas from October 1994 until that installation's BRAC-directed closure in September 2011. It supported the Human Systems Center until October 1998, when the Center was redesignated as the 311th Human Systems Wing. The group's mission, personnel, and equipment were all transferred to the 311th Air Base Group.

In August 2000, the unit was activated as the 70th Intelligence Wing, then later the 70th Intelligence, Surveillance, and Reconnaissance Wing, and has managed the USAF portion of the DoD's cryptology mission, exploiting intelligence, integrating it into air and space operations, and assisting commanders and others with intelligence requirements.

The wing's 544th Intelligence, Surveillance and Reconnaissance Group inactivated on 24 July 2020 when it became Space Delta 7 of the US Space Force.

== Lineage ==
70th Group

- Constituted as 70th Observation Group on 1 September 1941

Activated on 13 September 1941
Redesignated 70th Reconnaissance Group on 2 April 1943
Redesignated 70th Tactical Reconnaissance Group on 11 August 1943
Disbanded on 30 November 1943
Reconstituted and redesignated 70th Reconnaissance Group on 10 March 1947
Activated in the Reserve on 26 April 1947
Inactivated on 27 June 1949
Consolidated with the 70th Strategic Reconnaissance Wing on 31 January 1984 as the 70th Strategic Reconnaissance Wing

70th Wing

- Constituted as 70th Strategic Reconnaissance Wing on 23 March 1953

Activated on 24 January 1955
Redesignated 70th Bombardment Wing, Medium on 25 October 1961
Discontinued and inactivated on 25 June 1962
Redesignated: 70th Bombardment Wing, Heavy' and activated 15 November 1962 (not organized)
Organized on 1 February 1963
Inactivated on 31 December 1969
Consolidated with the 70th Reconnaissance Group on 31 January 1984 (remained inactive)
Redesignated 70th Air Base Group on 16 September 1994
Activated on 1 October 1994
Inactivated on 1 October 1998
Redesignated 70th Intelligence Wing on 17 July 2000
Activated on 16 August 2000
Redesignated 70th Intelligence, Surveillance, and Reconnaissance Wing on 1 January 2009

=== Assignments ===
- 4th Air Support (later, 4th Ground Air Support; IV Ground Air Support; IV Air Support) Command, 13 September 1941
- II Air Support Command, November 1942
- III Air Support (later, III Reconnaissance) Command, c. 6 August – 30 November 1943
- 325th Reconnaissance Wing (later, 325th Air Division, Reconnaissance), 26 April 1947 – 27 June 1949
- Second Air Force, 24 January 1955 (attached to 801st Air Division, until c. 19 October 1955)
- 825th Air (later, 825th Strategic Aerospace) Division, 1 August 1955 – 25 June 1962 (attached to 5th Air Division, 26 October – 17 December 1956)
- Strategic Air Command, 15 November 1962 (not organized)
- 816th Strategic Aerospace Division, 1 February 1963
- 17th Strategic Aerospace Division, 1 July 1965 – 31 December 1969
- Human Systems Center, 1 October 1994 – 1 October 1998
- Air Intelligence Agency, 16 August 2000
- Eighth Air Force, 1 February 2001
- Air Force Intelligence, Surveillance and Reconnaissance Agency (later Twenty-Fifth Air Force), 5 July 2006 – present

=== Components ===
Groups

- 70th Combat Support Group (later 70th Mission Support Group), 1 February 1963 – 31 December 1969, 1 May 2005 – present
- 70th Intelligence, Surveillance and Reconnaissance Group, 1 January 2009 – present
- 70th Operations Group, 1 May 2005 – 1 January 2009
- 544th Intelligence, Surveillance and Reconnaissance Group, 5 July 2006 – 24 July 2020
- 659th Intelligence, Surveillance and Reconnaissance Group, 8 September 2010 – present
- 691st Intelligence Group (later 691st Intelligence, Surveillance and Reconnaissance Group), 31 January 2008 – present
- 692d Intelligence Group, 1 October 2004 – 1 July 2008
- 694th Intelligence Group, 1 April 2008 – 1 January 2009
- 707th Intelligence, Surveillance and Reconnaissance Group, 7 October 2009 – present
- 770th Intelligence, Surveillance and Reconnaissance Group, Provisional, attached 1 October 2009 – 8 September 2010

Squadrons

- 6th Strategic Reconnaissance Squadron (later 6th Bombardment Squadron): 24 June 1955 – 25 June 1962 (detached 1 May-c. October 1955); 1 February 1963 – 31 December 1969
- 26th Tactical Reconnaissance Squadron: 2 March 1942 – 30 November 1943
- 26th Photographic Reconnaissance Squadron (later 26th Strategic Reconnaissance Squadron, 681st Bombardment Squadron): 1 August 1947 – 27 June 1949; 24 January 1955 – 25 June 1962
- 35th Photographic Reconnaissance Squadron see 123d Observation Squadron
- 57th Reconnaissance Squadron: 1 August 1947 – 27 June 1949
- 61st Reconnaissance Squadron (later 61st Strategic Reconnaissance Squadron, 61st Bombardment Squadron): 26 April 1947 – 27 June 1949; 24 January 1955 – 25 June 1962 (detached 15 July-c. October 1955)
- 70th Air Refueling Squadron: 1 August 1955 – 1 August 1961 (detached 27 January – 16 August 1956; 24 June-c. 24 September 1957, 3 September 1958 – 12 January 1959, and 5 October 1960 – 11 January 1961)
- 70th Operations Support Squadron, 14 January 2009 – present
- 112th Liaison Squadron: 30 April – 11 August 1943
- 116th Observation Squadron (later 116th Reconnaissance Squadron, 116th Tactical Reconnaissance Squadron), 13 September 1941 – 30 November 1943
- 123d Observation Squadron (later 123d Reconnaissance Squadron, 35th Photographic Reconnaissance Squadron), assigned 15 September 1941 – 10 August 1943, attached 11 August – 31 October 1943
- 681st Bombardment Squadron see 26th Photographic Reconnaissance Squadron
- 902d Air Refueling Squadron: 1 February 1963 – 31 December 1969

Other

- Air Force Cryptological Office, 1 August 2000 – present

=== Stations ===
- Gray Field, Washington, 13 September 1941
- Salinas Army Air Base, California, 1 March 1943
- Redmond Army Air Field, Oregon, 15 August 1943
- Corvallis Army Air Field, Oregon, October 1943
- Will Rogers Field, Oklahoma, 14–30 November 1943
- Hill Air Force Base, Utah, 26 April 1947 – 27 June 1949
- Little Rock Air Force Base, Arkansas, 24 January 1955 – 25 June 1962 (deployed to Lockbourne AFB, Ohio, until 19 October 1955)
- Clinton-Sherman Air Force Base, Oklahoma, 1 February 1963 – 31 December 1969
- Brooks Air Force Base, Texas, 1 October 1994 – 1 October 1998
- Fort George G. Meade, Maryland, 17 July 2000–present

=== Aircraft ===
- Douglas O-38 (1941)
- Douglas O-46 (1941–1942)
- North American O-47 (1941–1943)
- O-49 Vigilant (1941–1943)
- Bell P-39 Airacobra (1943)
- North American B-25 Mitchell (1943)
- L-5 Sentinel (1943)
- Boeing RB-47 Stratojet (1955–1962)
- Boeing KC-97 Stratofreighter (1955–1961)
- Boeing B-47 Stratojet (1961–1962)
- Boeing B-52 Stratofortress (1963–1969)
- Boeing KC-135 Stratotanker (1963–1969)

== List of commanders ==
				Term	
No.					
No.	Portrait	Colonel Harold J. Beatty	Aug 2000	July 2002	Term length
-	John D. Bansemer	Colonel; John D. Bansemer	May 2009	24 June 2011	~2 years, 54 days
-	Mary F. O'Brien	Colonel; Mary F. O'Brien	24 June 2011	10 July 2013	2 years, 16 days
-	Kevin D. Dixon	Colonel; Kevin D. Dixon	10 July 2013	June 2015	~1 year, 326 days
-	Thomas Hensley	Colonel; Thomas Hensley	June 2015	17 May 2017	~1 year, 350 days
-	Matteo Martemucci	Colonel; Matteo Martemucci	17 May 2017	10 June 2019	2 years, 24 days
-	Brian J. Tyler	Colonel; Brian J. Tyler	10 June 2019	Incumbent	7 years, 58 days

== See also ==
- List of B-47 units of the United States Air Force
- List of B-52 Units of the United States Air Force
- List of wings of the United States Air Force

This article incorporates public domain material from the Air Force Historical Research Agency

- Maurer, Maurer, ed. (1983) [1961]. Air Force Combat Units of World War II (PDF) (reprint ed.). Washington, DC: Office of Air Force History. ISBN 0-912799-02-1. LCCN 61060979. Archived from the original (PDF) on 20 December 2016.
- Maurer, Maurer, ed. (1982) [1969]. Combat Squadrons of the Air Force, World War II (PDF) (reprint ed.). Washington, DC: Office of Air Force History. ISBN 0-405-12194-6. LCCN 70605402. OCLC 72556. Archived from the original (PDF) on 20 December 2016.
- Mueller, Robert (1989). Air Force Bases, Vol. I, Active Air Force Bases Within the United States of America on 17 September 1982 (PDF). Washington, DC: Office of Air Force History. ISBN 0-912799-53-6.
- Ravenstein, Charles A. (1984). Air Force Combat Wings, Lineage & Honors Histories 1947–1977. Washington, DC: Office of Air Force History. ISBN 0-912799-12-9.
- Ravenstein, Charles A. (1984). A Guide to Air Force Lineage and Honors (2d, Revised ed.). Maxwell AFB, AL: USAF Historical Research Center.
