= 691st Intelligence, Surveillance and Reconnaissance Group =

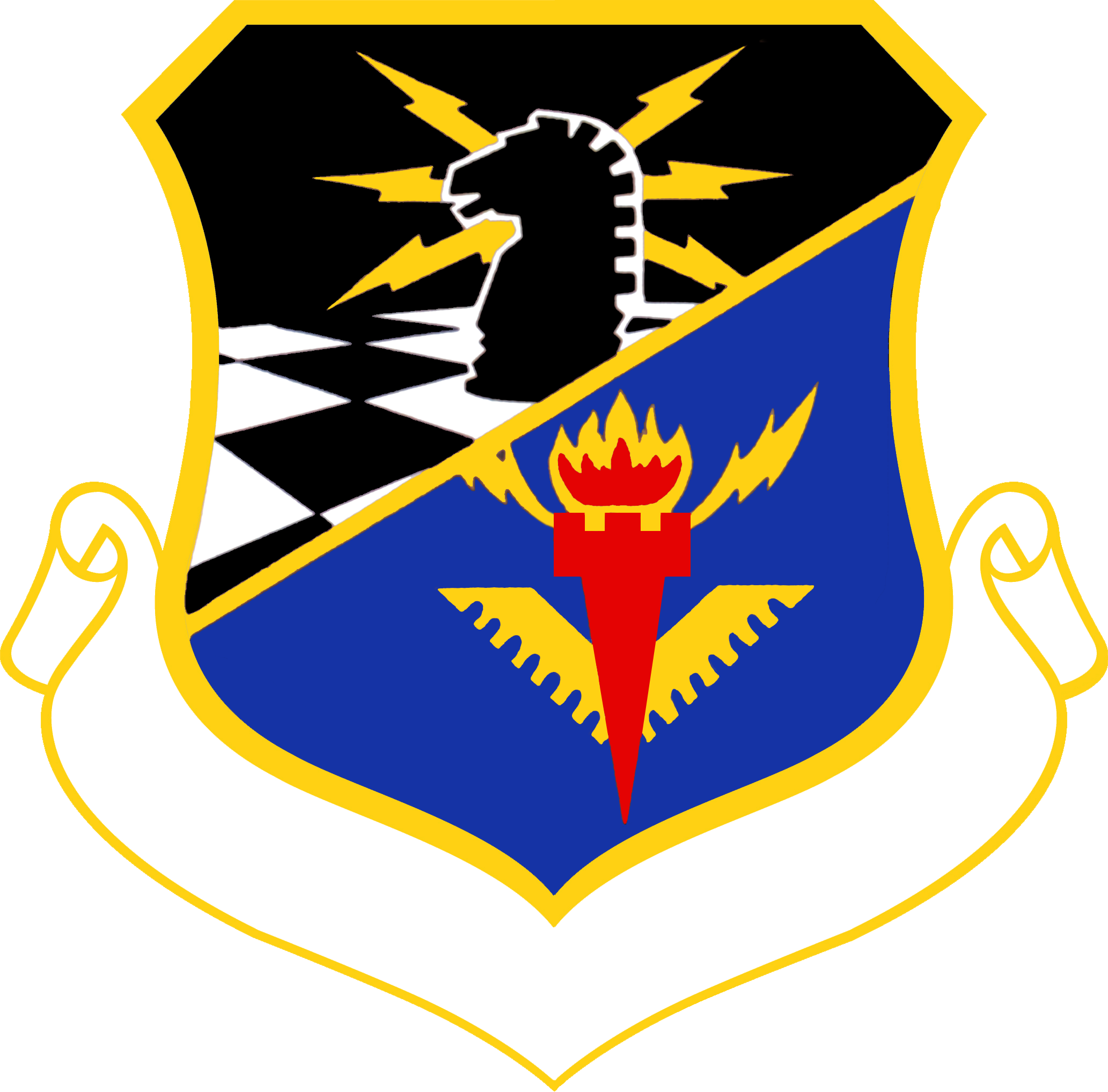
- Group emblem
- Active: 1988–1991; 2008–2014; 2016 – present
- Country: United States
- Branch: United States Air Force
- Type: Dependant group
- Role: Intelligence and cryptologic operations
- Part of: 70th Intelligence, Surveillance and Reconnaissance Wing
- Headquarters: Fort George G. Meade, Maryland
- Decorations: Air Force Outstanding Unit Award

The United States Air Force's 691st Intelligence, Surveillance and Reconnaissance Group is an intelligence unit located at Fort George G. Meade, Maryland.

== Mission ==
The mission of the 691 ISR Group is to execute operations providing intelligence, surveillance and reconnaissance to national decision makers, while providing planning, programming, logistics, and systems engineering expertise to execute cryptologic missions, in addition to promoting community relations and public affairs initiatives within a multinational and multi-service environment.

== History ==
=== 691st Electronic Security Wing ===
The group was first activated in June 1988 as the 691st Electronic Security Wing at Lindsey Air Station, in Wiesbaden, Germany. The wing replaced the 6910th Electronic Security Wing, absorbing the 6910th's personnel and equipment and assuming command of Electronic Security Command's units in Germany. The wing worked with the 66th Electronic Combat Wing to integrate ESC's assets and support forces into the exercises, activities and war plans of United States Air Forces Europe and NATO. In 1991, two of the wing's squadrons were inactivated and in October the wing was inactivated and its remaining squadrons assigned to the 26th Intelligence Wing.

=== Reactivation as a group at RAF Menwith Hill ===
The wing was redesignated the 691st Intelligence Group and reactivated at RAF Menwith Hill in January 2008, assuming the equipment and personnel of Detachment 1, 70th Intelligence Wing. At Menwith Hill, the 691st Group provided cryptologic liaison support to the United Kingdom Ministry of Defence's largest operational field site, as well as maintaining liaison activities for allied information operations. The group was inactivated in September 2014, and its 451st Intelligence Squadron reassigned directly to the 70th Wing.

=== Reactivation at Fort Meade ===
By 2015 the 707th Intelligence, Surveillance and Reconnaissance Group had expanded to the point that it was larger than most wings, and a division was made to spin off three of its squadrons into a separate group. In May 2016, the 691st was again activated at Fort George G. Meade to assume responsibility for these units.

== Lineage ==
- Constituted as the 691st Electronic Security Wing on 21 June 1988

Activated on 15 July 1988
Inactivated on 1 October 1991

- Redesignated 691st Intelligence Group on 10 January 2008

Activated on 31 January 2008
Redesignated 691st Intelligence, Surveillance, and Reconnaissance Group on 1 January 2009
Inactivated on 15 September 2014
Activated on 5 May 2016

=== Assignments ===
- European Electronic Security Division, 15 July 1988 – 1 October 1991
- 70th Intelligence Wing (later 70th Intelligence, Surveillance, and Reconnaissance Wing), 31 January 2008 – 15 Sep 2014
- 70th Intelligence, Surveillance, and Reconnaissance Wing, 5 May 2016 – present

=== Components ===
- 451st Intelligence Squadron – RAF Menwith Hill, United Kingdom, 31 Jan 2008 – 15 May 2014
- 6911th Electronic Security Squadron, 15 July 1988 – 1 October 1991

Hahn Air Base, Germany

- 6913th Electronic Security Squadron, 15 July 1988 – 13 March 1991

Flak Kaserne, Germany

- 6914th Electronic Security Squadron, 15 July 1988 – 1 October 1991

Sembach Air Base, Germany

- 6915th Electronic Security Squadron (later 6915th Electronic Security Support Squadron, 6915th Electronic Security Squadron), 15 July 1988 – 1 October 1991

Bad Aibling, Germany

- 6919th Electronic Security Squadron, 15 July 1988 – 21 May 1991

Sembach Air Base, Germany

=== Stations ===
- Lindsey Air Station, Germany, 15 July 1988 – 1 October 1991)
- RAF Menwith Hill, United Kingdom, 31 January 2008 – 15 September 2014
- Fort George G. Meade, Maryland, 5 May 2016 – present

=== Awards ===
Award streamer	Award	Dates	Notes
	Air Force Outstanding Unit Award	15 July 1988 – 30 June 1990	691st Electronic Security Wing
	Air Force Outstanding Unit Award	1 June 2008-31 May 2009	691st Intelligence Group (later 691st Intelligence, Surveillance, and Reconnaissance Group)
	Air Force Outstanding Unit Award	1 January-31 December 2010	691st Intelligence, Surveillance, and Reconnaissance Group
	Air Force Outstanding Unit Award	1 January-31 December 2011	691st Intelligence, Surveillance, and Reconnaissance Group
