= 61 Squadron =

61 Squadron or 61st Squadron may refer to:

- No. 61 Squadron RAF, a unit of the United Kingdom Royal Air Force
- 61st Fighter Squadron, a soon to be activated unit of the United States Air Force
- 61st Bombardment Squadron, a unit of the United States Air Force
- 61st Airlift Squadron, a unit of the United States Air Force

== See also ==
- 61st Division (disambiguation)
