= 26th Reconnaissance Squadron =

26th Reconnaissance Squadron may refer to:

- The 416th Flight Test Squadron, constituted as the 26th Reconnaissance Squadron (Heavy) in January 1942 but redesignated 416th Bombardment Squadron( Heavy) before activation
- The 26th Tactical Missile Squadron, designated the 26th Reconnaissance Squadron (Fighter) from April 1943 to August 1943.
- The 681st Bombardment Squadron, designated the 26th Reconnaissance Squadron, Very Long Range (Photographic - Radar Countermeasures) from August 1947 to June 1949

== See also ==
- The 26th Photographic Reconnaissance Squadron
- The 26th Strategic Reconnaissance Squadron
- The 26th Tactical Reconnaissance Squadron
