= 707th Intelligence, Surveillance and Reconnaissance Group =

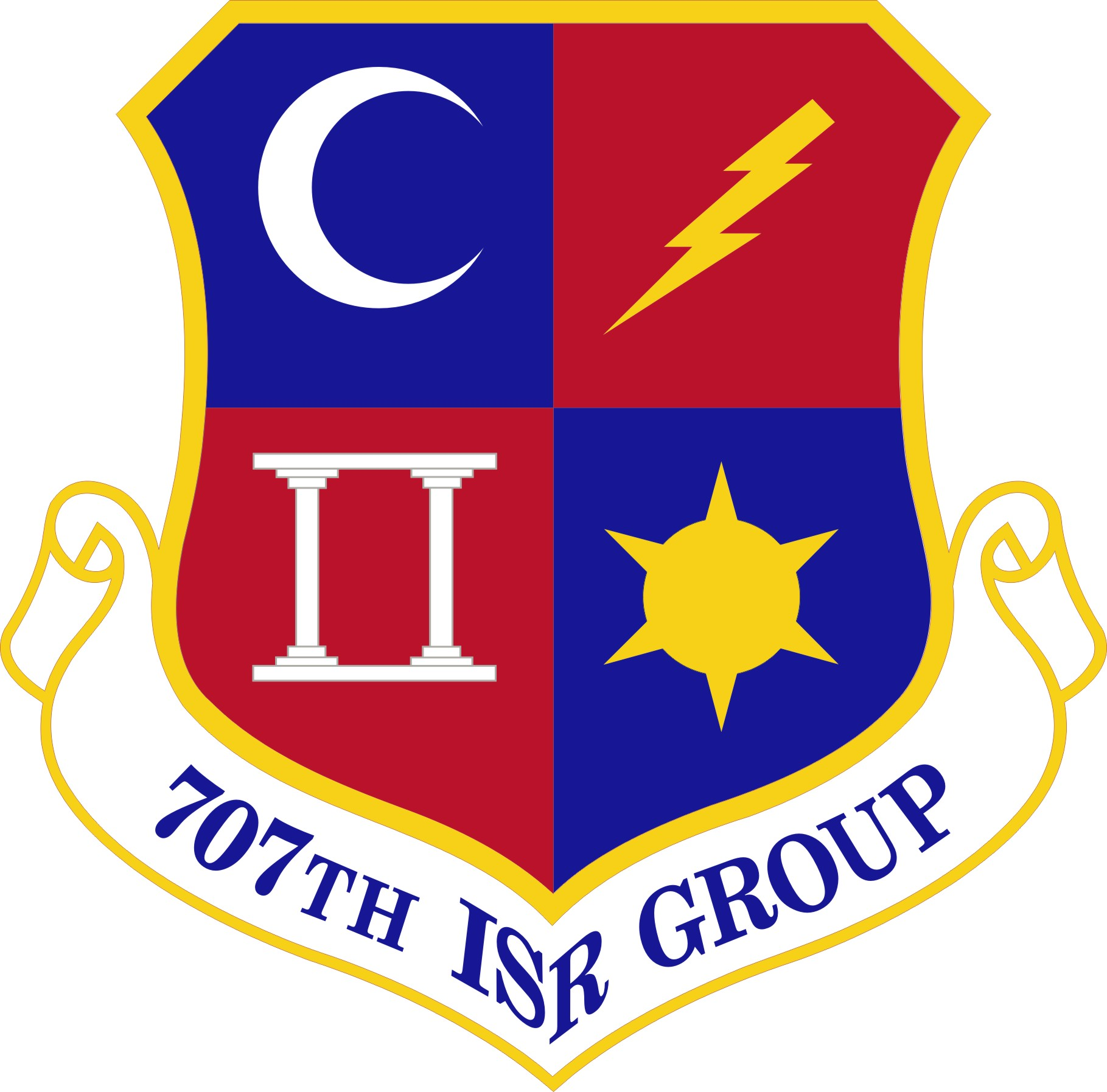
- Group emblem
- Active: 1974–1993; 2009 – present
- Country: United States
- Branch: United States Air Force
- Type: Dependant group
- Role: Intelligence and cryptologic operations
- Size: c. 1,900 personnel
- Part of: 70th Intelligence, Surveillance and Reconnaissance Wing
- Base: Fort George G. Meade, Maryland
- Decorations: Air Force Outstanding Unit Award

The 707th Intelligence, Surveillance and Reconnaissance Group (707 ISRG) is an intelligence processing group of the United States Air Force. It is part of the 70th Intelligence, Surveillance and Reconnaissance Wing located at Fort George G. Meade, Maryland.

The group is the largest group in the 70th ISR Wing with more than 1,900 personnel executing both Air Force and National Security Agency missions. Intelligence provided by the group's men and women serves customers such as the President, Secretary of Defense, Combatant Commanders and personnel on the ground engaged in worldwide operations, including the War in Afghanistan (2001-2021).

The Group is a key enabler of, and contributor to, AF National-Tactical Integration and Expeditionary Signals Intelligence (SIGINT), as well as the AF Distributed Common Ground System, all of which are focused on providing combat intelligence to deployed Department of Defense personnel. Their mission also includes computer network operations as well as manufacturing and installing communications intelligence equipment for SIGINT missions worldwide.

Additionally, the Group serves as the lead for the Global Air Analysis SIGINT mission which analyzes and reports high-interest aerial activity. Finally, the 707th ISR Group operates the Consolidated Remote Operations Facility, Airborne, providing near real-time intelligence support to ongoing sensitive reconnaissance missions.

== Unit emblem ==
The unit Emblem was approved on 10 November 1972 for the 6917th Security Group. Upon inactivation of the 6917th Security Group on 1 October 1978, the 6917th Security Squadron (later, 6917th Electronic Security Group) adopted the former group emblem. Modified on 25 May 2010.

== Units ==
Major units under the group include

- 22d Intelligence Squadron
- 29th Intelligence Squadron
- 32d Intelligence Squadron
- 34th Intelligence Squadron
- 94th Intelligence Squadron
- 526th Intelligence Squadron
- 707th Intelligence Support Squadron
- 707th Force Support Squadron

== Lineage ==
- Designated as 6917th Security Squadron, and activated, on 1 July 1974

Re-designated as 6917th Electronic Security Group on 1 August 1979
Inactivated on 15 July 1993

- Re-designated as 707th Intelligence, Surveillance, and Reconnaissance Group on 25 September 2009

Activated on 15 October 2009.

== Assignments ==
- 6017th Security Group, 1 July 1974
- United States Air Force Security Service, 1 October 1978
- Electronic Security Command, 1 August 1979
- Electronic Security, Europe (later European Electronic Security Division), 30 September 1980
- 26th Intelligence Wing, 1 October 1991 – 15 July 1993
- 70th Intelligence, Surveillance and Reconnaissance Wing, 15 October 2009 – present

== Stations ==
- San Vito Dei Normanni Air Station, Italy, 1 July 1974 – 15 July 1993
- Fort George G. Meade, Maryland, 15 October 2009 – present

== Decorations ==
The group has been awarded the following decorations:

Award streamer	Award	Dates	Notes
	Air Force Outstanding Unit Award	1 July 1976 – 30 June 1978	6917th Electronic Security Group
	Air Force Outstanding Unit Award	1 July 1980 – 30 June 1982	6917th Electronic Security Group
	Air Force Outstanding Unit Award	1 July 1984 – 30 June 1986	6917th Electronic Security Group
	Air Force Outstanding Unit Award	July 1990 – 31 May 1992	6917th Electronic Security Group
