= 32nd Intelligence Squadron =

32d Intelligence Squadron

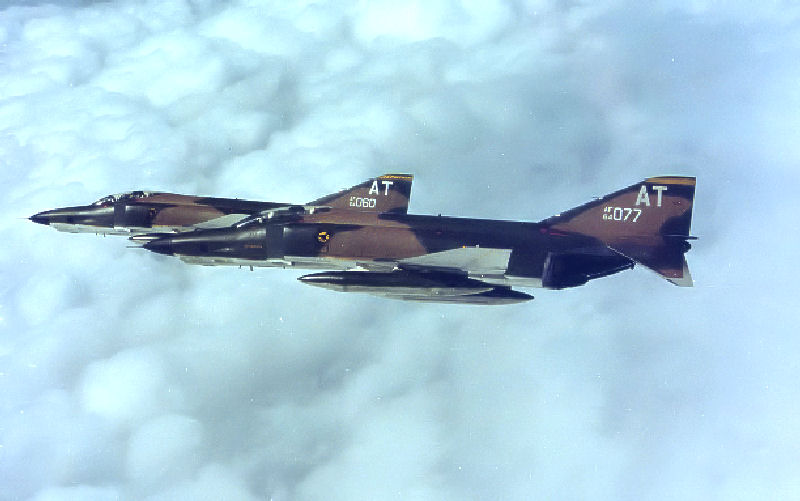
- Squadron RF-4C Phantom IIs at RAF Alconbury in 1970
- Active: 1943-1945; 1952–1976; 1991-present
- Country: United States
- Branch: United States Air Force
- Type: Squadron
- Role: Intelligence, Surveillance and Reconnaissance
- Part of: Air Combat Command
- Garrison/HQ: Fort George G. Meade, Maryland
- Engagements: European Theater of Operations; Mediterranean Theater of Operations
- Decorations: Distinguished Unit Citation; Air Force Outstanding Unit Award with Combat "V" Device; Air Force Outstanding Unit Award

Insignia
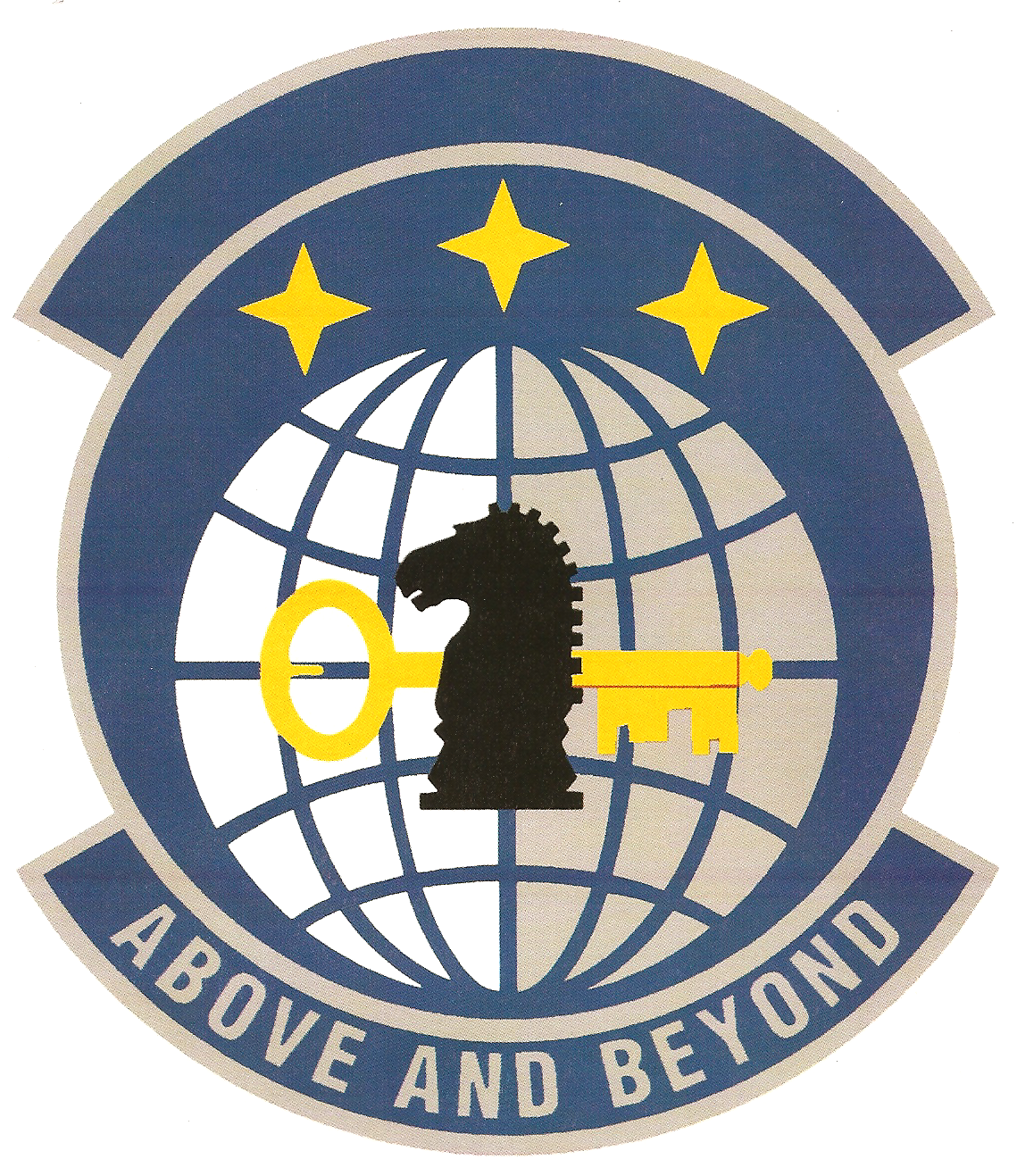
- 32d Intelligence Squadron emblem (Note: Approved 18 July 1996.)

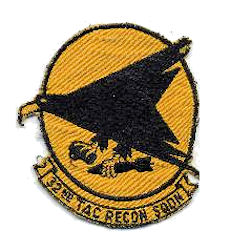
- Patch with 32d Tactical Reconnaissance Squadron emblem

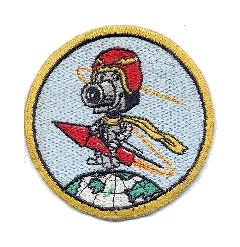
- Patch with 32d Tactical Reconnaissance Squadron emblem (Note: Approved 17 January 1955.)

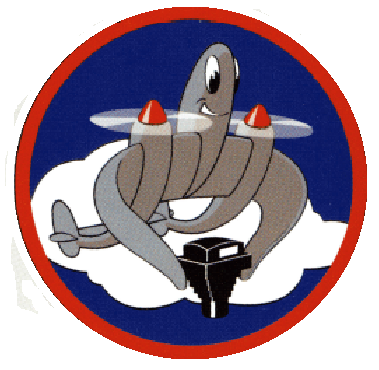
- 32 Photographic Reconnaissance Sq emblem

The 32d Intelligence Squadron is a unit of the United States Air Force 707th Intelligence, Surveillance and Reconnaissance Group located at Fort George G. Meade, Maryland.

== Overview ==
The 32d Intelligence Squadron is a specialized organization that consists of teams of intelligence professionals who support global power and secure and maintain information superiority by conducting operations that support Air Force, joint, combined, and special operations in peacetime and in war.

It provides effective organization, control, technical guidance, training, support, products, and tasking for ongoing intelligence analysis and dissemination activities. Serves the Department of Defense and other customers as directed, providing the core capability assisting the National Security Agency mission, through around-the-clock operations in support of national and tactical objectives. Performs information operations through multiple sources for national, theater, and tactical customers.

== History ==
=== World War II ===
The squadron was established in mid-1943 as a tactical reconnaissance and photographic mapping squadron. Initial squadron training was under the Third Air Force, before it was deployed to the Mediterranean Theater of Operations and became part of Fifteenth Air Force in southern Italy in August 1945.

The squadron's deployment was delayed by the sinking of the SS Paul Hamilton by German aircraft on 20 April 1944, in which 317 members of the unit were killed in a catastrophic explosion.

Equipped primarily with unarmed Lockheed F-5 Lightnings, the squadron flew hazardous long-range intelligence and photo-mapping missions over enemy-held Italy and Occupied Europe, to get pictures required for the aerial war against the Axis powers. Initially it flew most missions over enemy-occupied Italy, Corsica and Sardinia, later flying missions over the Balkans. After the German surrender in May 1945, the squadron's personnel were demobilized in Italy during the summer of 1945, and the squadron was inactivated as a paper unit in the United States during October.

=== United States Air Forces in Europe ===
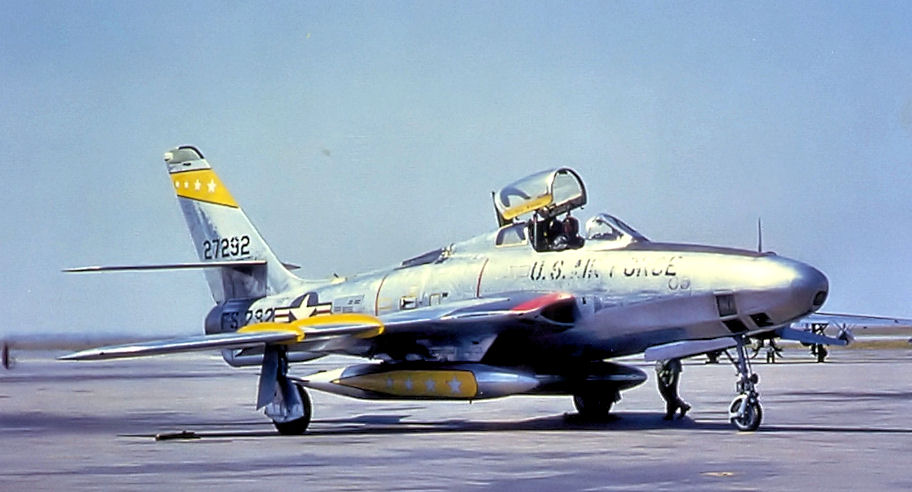
Squadron RF-84F (Note: Aircraft is Republic RF-84F-25-RE Thunderflash - serial 52-7292.)

In 1952 the squadron was reactivated as a North Atlantic Treaty Organization (NATO) tactical reconnaissance unit to be based in France as a result of the United States Cold War military buildup in Europe. It was activated by the transfer of the equipment and personnel of the Alabama Air National Guard 157th Tactical Reconnaissance Squadron, which had been federalized and brought to active duty during the Korean War. It took over the Lockheed RF-80A Shooting Star aircraft of the ANG unit, and trained for daylight reconnaissance missions.

The squadron, however was stationed at Fürstenfeldbruck Air Base in West Germany due to the uncompleted facilities at Toul-Rosières Air Base. Weather conditions in Germany severely restricted the training operations of the assigned RF-80As. The squadron frequently deployed to Nouasseur Air Base, Morocco during the winter of 1952-53 where the photo conditions were excellent.

The squadron moved to Spangdahlem Air Base, West Germany in May 1953 where all of the elements of the parent 10th TRW were assembled at one base. It re-equipped with the Republic RF-84F Thunderflash in 1955, as the RF-80s were deemed not mission-capable against the Soviet Mikoyan-Gurevich MiG-15.

In January 1958, the squadron was moved to Phalsbourg-Bourscheid Air Base, France while the runway at Spangdahlem was under repair and renovation. In March 1958, the squadron was reassigned to the 66th Tactical Reconnaissance Wing, which was moving to Phalsbourg from Sembach Air Base due to poor runway conditions. During May, the Thunderflashes were replaced by McDonnell RF-101C Voodoos, which was the fastest tactical reconnaissance aircraft ever flown by the USAF.

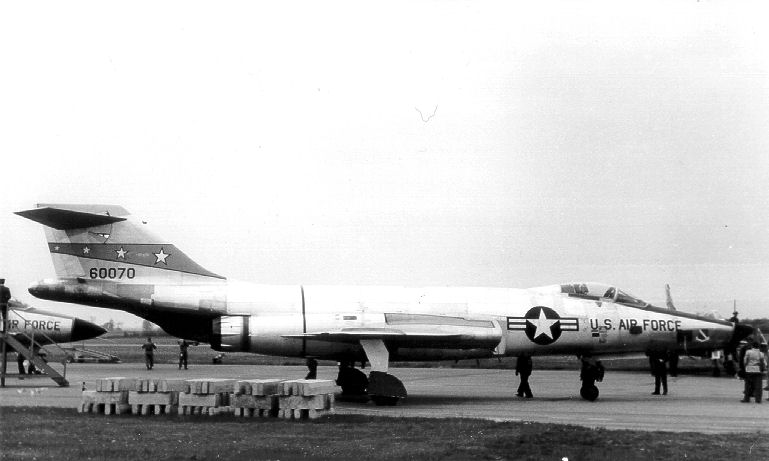
Squadron RF-101 VooDoo (Note: Aircraft is McDonnell RF-101C-65-MC Voodoo serial 56-70)

Routine training operations were flown from Laon for over seven years. In 1965 the squadron was again reassigned; to the 26th Tactical Reconnaissance Wing, which was being formed at Toul-Rosières Air Base. On 7 March 1966, French President Charles De Gaulle announced that France would withdraw from NATO's military structure but not leave the political organization. He gave NATO forces one year (until 1 April 1967) to depart France.

As a result, the 26th Tactical Reconnaissance Wing was relocated to Ramstein Air Base, West Germany. As part of the move from Toul, the 32d moved to England, where it rejoined the 10th Wing, now stationed at RAF Alconbury. It sent its RF-101s back to the United States, and at Alconbury received new McDonnell Douglas RF-4C Phantom II aircraft.

The 32d flew the RF-4C at Alconbury for the next ten years, before being inactivated in 1976. The advent of reconnaissance satellites made tactical reconnaissance less and less necessary by the mid-1970s. This, along with the need for budget reductions after the end of the Vietnam War caused a reduction in the numbers of frontline tactical reconnaissance aircraft. On 1 January 1976, the squadron was the first of two squadrons of the 10th Wing to be inactivated that year.

=== Intelligence operations ===
In 1991, Electronic Security Command reorganized its intelligence units at Ft George G. Meade, Maryland, organizing the 6941st Electronic Security Squadron there as a Major Command Controlled (MAJCON) unit. In the early 1990s, the Air Force eliminated this type of unit (commonly called a "four-digit" unit) by replacing them or consolidating them with Air Force Controlled (AFCON) units. In 1993, the two units were consolidated as the 32d Intelligence Squadron.

== Lineage ==
32d Tactical Reconnaissance Squadron

- Constituted as the 45th Reconnaissance Squadron (Fighter) on 25 June 1943 (Note: This unit is not related to the 45th Reconnaissance Squadron, which was originally organized as the 423d Night Fighter Squadron.)

Activated on 1 July 1943
Redesignated 32d Photographic Reconnaissance Squadron on 11 August 1943
Inactivated on 28 October 1945

- Redesignated 32d Tactical Reconnaissance Squadron, Photographic-Jet on 25 June 1952
- Redesignated 32 Tactical Reconnaissance Squadron on 1 October 1966

Reactivated on 10 July 1952
Inactivated 1 January 1976

- Consolidated with the 32d Intelligence Squadron on 1 October 1993

32d Intelligence Squadron

- Designated as the 6941st Electronic Security Squadron and activated on 1 Oct 1991
- Redesignated 32d Intelligence Squadron on 1 Oct 1993 and consolidated with the 32d Tactical Reconnaissance Squadron

=== Assignments ===
- 426th Reconnaissance Group, 1 July 1943
- III Reconnaissance Command (later III Tactical Air Command), 11 August 1943
- 90th Photographic Wing, c. 20 April 1944 (attached to 5th Photographic Group after 30 April 1944)
- 5th Photographic Group (later 5th Reconnaissance Group), 15 November 1944 – 28 October 1945
- 10th Tactical Reconnaissance Group, 10 July 1952
- 10th Tactical Reconnaissance Wing, 8 December 1957 (attached to 66th Tactical Reconnaissance Wing after 8 January 1958)
- 66th Tactical Reconnaissance Wing, 8 March 1958
- 26th Tactical Reconnaissance Wing, 1 October 1965
- 10th Tactical Reconnaissance Wing, 15 August 1966 – 1 January 1976
- 6940th Electronic Security Wing 1 October 1991
- 694th Electronic Security Wing (later 694th Intelligence Wing, 694th Intelligence Group), 1 October 1991 (Note: The 694th Electronic Security Wing replaced the 6940th Electronic Security wing the same day the squadron was activated.)
- 70th Operations Group, 1 May 2005
- 70th Intelligence, Surveillance, and Reconnaissance Group, 1 January 2009
- 707th Intelligence, Surveillance, and Reconnaissance Group, 7 October 2009 – present

=== Stations ===
- Gainesville Army Air Field, Texas, 1 July 1943
- Will Rogers Field, Oklahoma, 4 January-24 March 1944
- San Severo Airfield, Italy, 28 April 1944
- Bari Airfield, Italy, 11 August–October 1945
- Camp Kilmer, New Jersey, 26–28 October 1945
- Fürstenfeldbruck Air Base, West Germany, 10 July 1952
- Spangdahlem Air Base, West Germany, 17 May 1953
- Phalsbourg-Bourscheid Air Base, France, 31 July 1957
- Toul-Rosières Air Base, France, 17 October 1960
- Laon-Couvron Air Base, France, 1 March 1962
- Toul-Rosières Air Base, France, 1 July 1965
- RAF Alconbury, England, 15 August 1966 – 1 January 1976
- Ft George G. Meade, Maryland, 1 October 1991 – present

=== Aircraft ===
- North American B-25 Mitchell, 1943–1944
- de Havilland Mosquito, 1944
- Douglas A-20 Havoc, 1944
- Lockheed F-5 Lightning, 1944–1945
- Lockheed RF-80A Shooting Star, 1952–1956
- Republic RF-84F Thunderflash, 1955–1958
- McDonnell RF-101C Voodoo, 1958–1966
- McDonnell Douglas RF-4C Phantom II, 1966–1976
