= 7th Intelligence Squadron =

US Air Force unit

7th Intelligence Squadron
- Active: 1942–1945; 1948–1949; 2009-present
- Country: United States
- Branch: United States Air Force
- Role: Intelligence
- Part of: Air Combat Command
- Garrison/HQ: Fort George G. Meade, Maryland
- Engagements: Southwest Pacific Theater
- Decorations: Air Force Outstanding Unit Award; Philippine Republic Presidential Unit Citation

Insignia
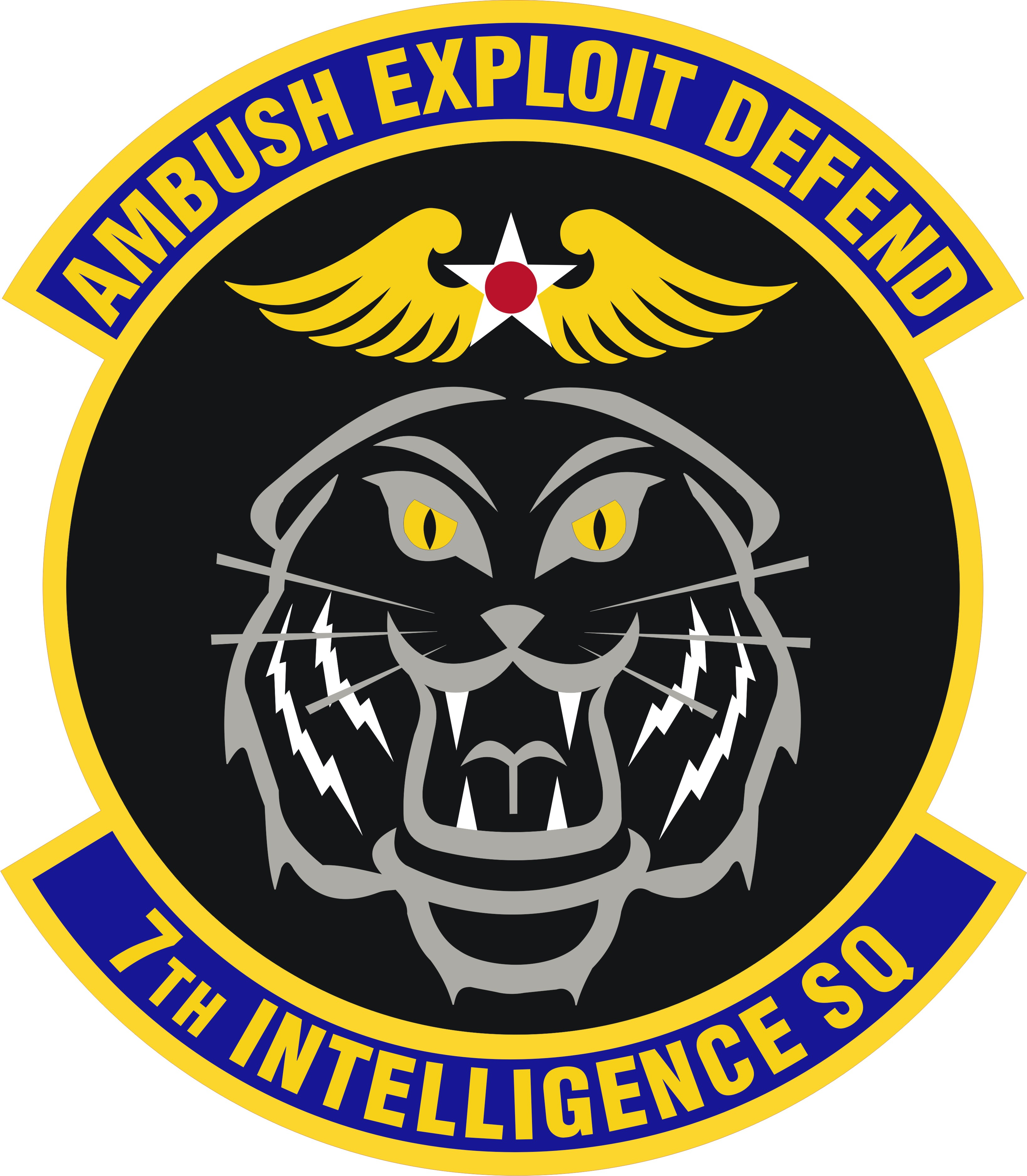
- 7th Intelligence Sq emblem

The United States Air Force's 7th Intelligence Squadron is an intelligence unit located at Fort George G. Meade, Maryland. The squadron, as the 7th Radio Squadron, Mobile, provided intelligence for American forces in New Guinea and the Philippines during World War II. As the 302d Radio Squadron, Mobile, it was active in the organized Reserve from 1948 to 1949.

== History ==
=== World War II ===
The squadron was first established in the Signal Corps at Davis-Monthan Field in July 1942 as the 957th Signal Radio Intelligence Company. In January the unit moved to California and trained there. In February 1944, it was converted to an Air Corps unit as the 7th Radio Squadron, Mobile, specializing in intercepting radio transmissions in Japanese.

In November 1944, the squadron shipped to New Guinea, arriving the following month. Until V-J Day, it conducted operations from New Guinea and the Philippines, remaining in theater through December 1945, when it returned to the United States and was inactivated.

=== Organized Reserve ===
The squadron was redesignated the 302d Radio Squadron, Mobile and allotted to the Organized Reserve. It was activated at San Antonio, Texas in 1948. However, President Truman's reduced 1949 defense budget required reductions in the number of units in the Air Force, and the 302d was inactivated in June 1949.

=== Reactivation ===
The squadron was reconstituted as the 7th Intelligence Squadron and reactivated in 2009 at Fort George G. Meade, Maryland.

== Lineage ==
- Constituted as the 957th Signal Radio Intelligence Company, Aviation on 23 July 1942
- Activated on 15 October 1942
- Redesignated 7 Radio Squadron, Mobile (J) (Note: The J designation indicates the unit was qualified on Japanese language intercepts.) on 19 February 1944
- Inactivated on 25 December 1945
- Redesignated 7th Radio Squadron, Mobile on 14 November 1946
- Redesignated 302d Radio Squadron, Mobile and allotted to the Organized Reserve on 29 March 1948
- Activated on 12 April 1948
- Inactivated on 22 June 1949
- Redesignated 7 Radio Squadron, Mobile, on 2 November 1949
- Disbanded on 15 June 1983
- Reconstituted and redesignated 7 Intelligence Squadron on 20 March 2009
- Activated on 15 April 2009

=== Assignments ===
- Second Air Force, 15 October 1942
- Fourth Air Force, 21 January 1943
- Thirteenth Air Force, 1 December 1944 – 25 December 1945
- Fourth Army, 29 March 1948 – 22 June 1949
- 70th Intelligence, Surveillance and Reconnaissance Wing, 15 April 2009 – present

=== Stations ===
- Davis-Monthan Field, Arizona, 15 October 1942
- Reno Army Air Base, Nevada, 17 November 1942
- Camp Pinedale, California, 21 January 1943
- Camp Stoneman, California, 5 October–11 November 1944
- Hollandia Airfield Complex, New Guinea, 1 December 1944
- Morotai, Luzon, Philippines, 16 January 1945
- Leyte, Philippines, 12 May–4 December 1945
- Camp Stoneman, California, 22–25 December 1945
- San Antonio, Texas, 29 March 1948 – 22 June 1949
- Fort George G. Meade, Maryland, 15 April 2009 – present

== Decorations ==
- Service Streamers: None.
- Campaign Streamers: World War II: Leyte; New Guinea; Southern Philippines.
- Armed Forces Expeditionary Streamers: None.
- Decorations: Philippine Presidential Unit Citation (WWII).
