= 26th Intelligence Squadron =

26th Intelligence Squadron

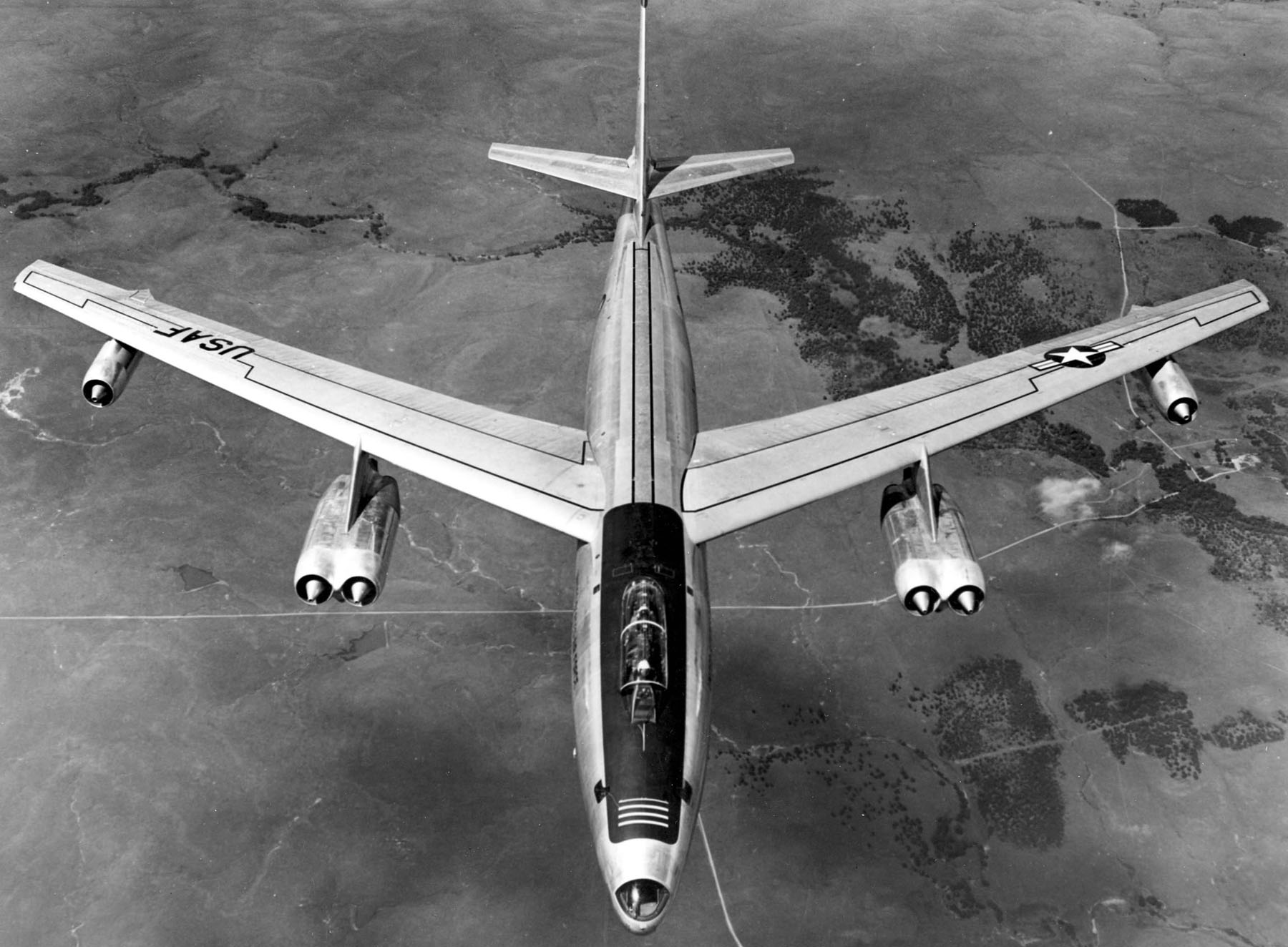
- Boeing RB-47E Stratojet as flown by the squadron
- Active: 1943-1946; 1947-1949; 1955-1962; 1993-1996; 2003–2006; 2022-present
- Country: United States
- Branch: United States Air Force
- Role: Military intelligence
- Part of: Air Combat Command
- Garrison/HQ: Buckley Space Force Base, Colorado
- Nickname: War Birds
- Motto: Key to Freedom
- Engagements: South West Pacific Theater of World War II
- Decorations: Distinguished Unit Citation; Air Force Outstanding Unit Award; Philippine Republic Presidential Unit Citation

Insignia
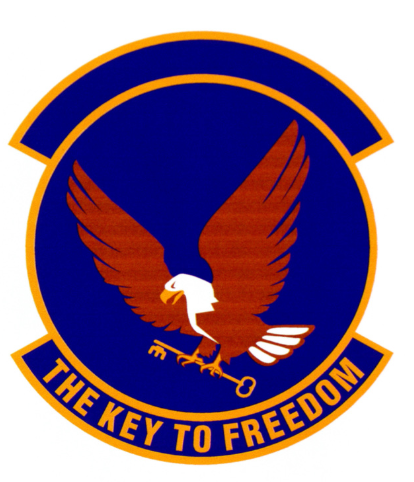
- 26th Intelligence Squadron emblem (Note: approved 4 August 1995.)

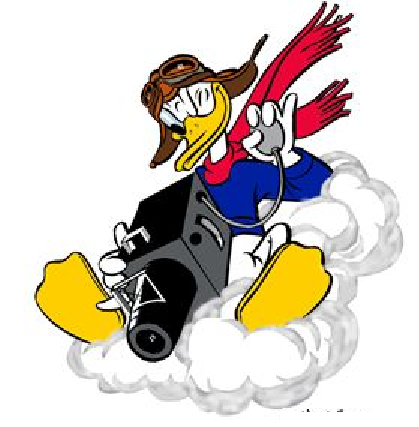
- 26th Photographic Reconnaissance Squadron emblem

The 26th Intelligence Squadron is an intelligence organization of the United States Air Force, located at Buckley Space Force Base, Colorado.

It was first activated as the 26th Photographic Reconnaissance Squadron during World War II. After training in the United States, the squadron deployed to the Southwest Pacific Theater, where it performed combat aerial reconnaissance missions, earning a Distinguished Unit Citation and a Philippine Republic Presidential Unit Citation. Following V-J Day, the squadron moved to Korea, where it was inactivated in 1946.

The squadron was active in the reserves from 1947 through 1949, then was activated again in 1955 as a Strategic Air Command Boeing RB-47 Stratojet reconnaissance unit. While continuing to fly the Stratojet, it transitioned to the medium bomber mission as the 681st Bombardment Squadron before inactivating in 1962.

The squadron was reactivated in 1993 as the 26th Intelligence Squadron before being inactivated again in 1996. As the 26th Air and Space intelligence Squadron it was active from 2003 to 2006. It was reactivated in 2022 as a part of the 544th Intelligence, Surveillance and Reconnaissance Group.

== History ==
=== World War II ===
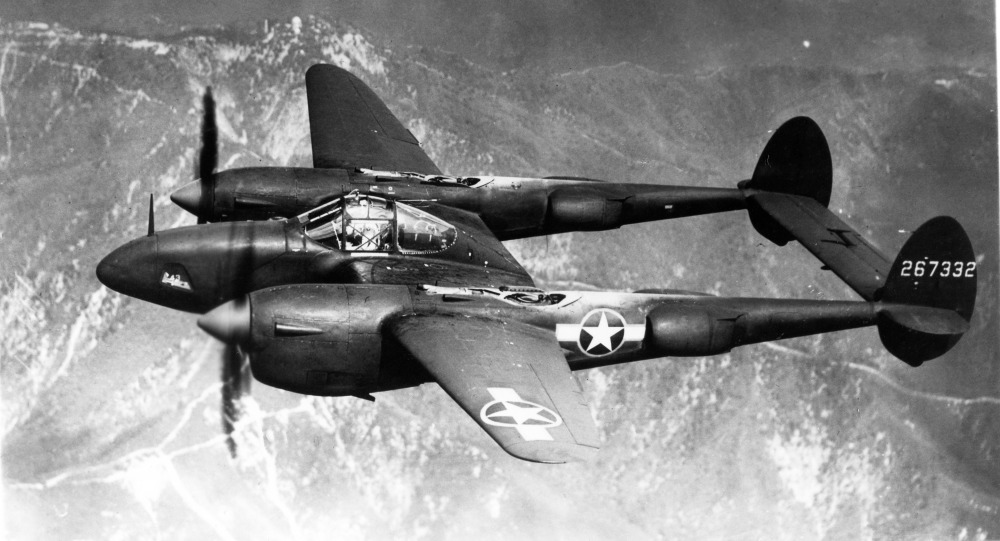
F-5 Lightning as flown by the squadron

The squadron was constituted as the 26th Photographic Reconnaissance Squadron in February 1943, but was redesignated the 26th Photographic Squadron before activating at Peterson Field, Colorado as one of the original squadrons of the 6th Photographic Group a week later. By August, the squadron had returned to its original designation. The squadron trained with Lockheed F-4 Lightnings until October 1943, when it departed for the Southwest Pacific Theater.

The squadron arrived in Sydney, Australia in late November, moving forward to Archerfield Airport in Queensland within a week. The squadron soon upgraded to the newer F-5 version of the Lighting. The squadron photographed airfields, coastal defenses, harbor facilities and other Japanese military installations in New Guinea, Borneo, the Bismarck Archipelego and the Southern Philippines. During 1944, the squadron moved to New Guinea and moved forward along the northern coast of the island as Allied forces advanced.

In mid September 1944, the squadron flew unescorted photographic missions over Leyte, providing the maximum amount of vital information for planning Operation King Two, the initial amphibious landings in the Philippines. For these missions, the squadron was awarded the Distinguished Unit Citation. In January 1945, the squadron moved to its first station in the Philippines, Lingayen Airfield on Luzon. From the northern Philippines, it conducted missions as far north as Formosa. In August, it moved to Okinawa and conducted some missions over southern Japan. Following V-J Day, the squadron moved to Kimpo Airfield, Korea, and was inactivated there in February 1946.

=== Air Force reserve ===
The squadron was redesignated the 26th Reconnaissance Squadron, activated in the reserves in August 1947 at Hamilton Field, California, and assigned to the 70th Reconnaissance Group, which was located at Hill Field, Utah, At Hamilton, it trained under the supervision of Air Defense Command (ADC)'s 2346th Air Force Reserve Training Center. It is unclear whether or not the unit was fully manned or equipped. In 1948 Continental Air Command assumed responsibility for managing reserve and Air National Guard units from ADC. President Truman's reduced 1949 defense budget required reductions in the number of units in the Air Force, and the squadron, along with the reserve air division and two reconnaissance groups at Hamilton, was inactivated on 27 June 1949, with most of its resources transferred to the 349th Troop Carrier Wing, which took over reserve operations at Hamilton.

=== Strategic Air Command ===
The squadron was redesignated the 26th Strategic Reconnaissance Squadron and activated in January 1955 as an element of the 70th Strategic Reconnaissance Wing. However, the squadron's new station, Little Rock Air Force Base, Arkansas, was still undergoing construction to permit the operation of Boeing RB-47 Stratojets from its runways. Elements of the 70th Wing at Little Rock went unmanned, although operational elements were deployed for training at Lockbourne Air Force Base, Ohio. The squadron finally became operational at Little Rock on 2 October 1955 and began flying reconnaissance missions globally to support Strategic Air Command's mission. From 26 October until 17 December 1956, the 26th deployed to Sidi Slimane Air Base, Morocco. The squadron continued fly reconnaissance missions until 1962, although the scale of operations was reduced after February 1958, as the 70th Wing added a training mission to its reconnaissance duties.

In October 1961, the squadron was redesignated the 681st Bombardment Squadron, (Note: The number change was required with the conversion to the bomber mission because there was already a 26th Bombardment Squadron at Altus Air Force Base, Oklahoma.) and began to convert to B-47 medium bombers. However, the squadron was inactivated in June 1962, before it became combat ready, as the 384th Bombardment Wing became the only B-47 unit at Little Rock.

=== Intelligence unit ===
The squadron was redesignated the 26th Intelligence Squadron in April 1993 and activated at Eglin Air Force Base, Florida, where it formed part of the 68th Electronic Combat Group until inactivating in September 1966. It was redesignated the 26th Air and Space Intelligence Squadron and activated at Hickam Air Force Base, Hawaii and assigned to the 502d Air Operations Group at the end of May 2006 and was inactivated on 6 October 2006, when the 502d Air Operations Group was replaced by the 613th Air and Space Operations Center.

The squadron returned to its designation as the 26th Intelligence Squadron and activated again at Buckley Space Force Base in August 2022.

== Lineage ==
- Constituted as the 26th Photographic Reconnaissance Squadron on 5 February 1943

Redesignated 26th Photographic Squadron (Light) on 6 February 1943
Activated on 9 February 1943
Redesignated 26th Photographic Reconnaissance Squadron on 11 August 1943
Inactivated on 20 February 1946
Redesignated 26th Reconnaissance Squadron, Very Long Range (Photographic-RCM) on 3 July 1947
Activated in the reserve on 1 August 1947
Inactivated on 27 June 1949
Redesignated 26th Strategic Reconnaissance Squadron, Medium on 14 January 1955
Activated on 24 January 1955
Redesignated 681st Bombardment Squadron, Medium on 25 October 1961
Discontinued and inactivated on 25 June 1962
Redesignated 26th Intelligence Squadron on 9 April 1993
Activated on 15 April 1993
Inactivated on 5 September 1996
Redesignated 26th Air and Space Intelligence Squadron on 16 May 2003
Activated on 29 May 2003
Inactivated 6 October 2006
Redesignated 26th Intelligence Squadron on 28 June 2022
Activated on 30 August 2022

=== Assignments ===
- 6th Photographic Group (later 6th Photographic Reconnaissance and Mapping Group. 6th Photographic Reconnaissance Group, 6th Photographic Group, 6th Reconnaissance Group), 9 February 1943 (attached to 308th Bombardment Wing after 22 October 1945)
- 308th Bombardment Wing, 21 November 1945 – 20 February 1946
- 70th Reconnaissance Group, 1 August 1947 – 27 June 1949
- 70th Strategic Reconnaissance Wing (later 70th Bombardment Wing), 24 January 1955 25 June 1962
- 68th Electronic Combat Group, 15 April 1993 – 5 September 1996
- 502d Air Operations Group, 29 May 2003 – 6 October 2006
- 544th Intelligence, Surveillance, and Reconnaissance Group, 30 August 2022 – present

=== Stations ===
- Peterson Field, Colorado, 9 February 1943 – 22 October 1943
- Sydney Airport, New South Wales, Australia, 19 November 1943
- Archerfield Airport, Queensland, Australia, 25 November 1943
- Dobodura Airfield Complex, New Guinea, 26 January 1944 (detachment at Port Moresby Airfield Complex, New Guinea, February 1944 - March 1944)
- Finschhafen Airfield, New Guinea, 19 February 1944
- Nadzab Airfield Complex, New Guinea, 28 March 1944 (air echelon at Hollandia Airfield Complex, New Guinea, after 25 June 1944)
- Hollandia Airfield Complex, New Guinea, 23 Ju1y 1944
- Mokmer Airfield, Biak, Netherlands East Indies, 5 August 1944
- Lingayen Airfield, Luzon, Philippines, 16 January 1945 (air echelon at Clark Field, Luzon, Philippines, 22 July–September 1945)
- Kadena Airfield, Okinawa, 6 August 1945
- Kimpo Airfield, Korea, October 1945 – 20 February 1946
- Hamilton Field (later Hamilton Air Force Base), California, 1 August 1947 –27 Jun 1949
- Little Rock Air Force Base, Arkansas, 24 January 1955 – 25 June 1962
- Eglin Air Force Base, Florida, 15 April 1993 – 5 September 1996
- Hickam Air Force Base, Hawaii, 29 May 2003 – 6 October 2006
- Buckley Space Force Base, Colorado, 30 August 2022 – present

=== Aircraft ===
- Lockheed F-4 Lightning, 1943
- Lockheed F-5 Lightning, 1944-1946.
- Boeing RB-47 Stratojet, 1955-1961
- Boeing B-47 Stratojet, 1961-1962
