= 61st Strategic Reconnaissance Squadron =

61st Strategic Reconnaissance Squadron (later 61st Bombardment Squadron)
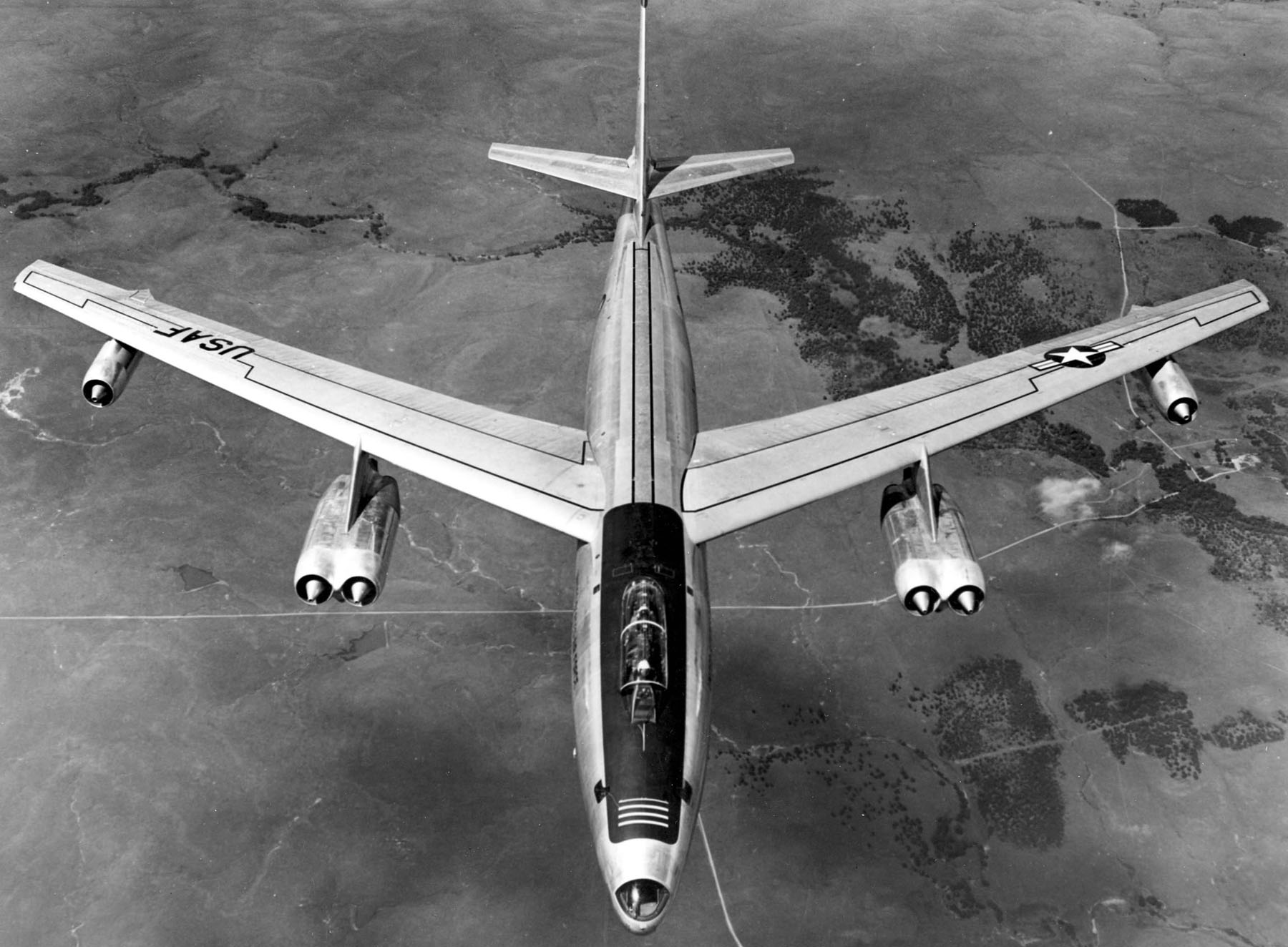
- RB-47E Stratojet as flown by the squadron
- Active: 1947–1949; 1955–1962
- Country: United States
- Branch: United States Air Force
- Role: Strategic bomber
- Decorations: Air Force Outstanding Unit Award

The 61st Bombardment Squadron is an inactive United States Air Force unit. It was last assigned to the 70th Bombardment Wing at Little Rock Air Force Base, Arkansas, where it was inactivated on 25 June 1962.

It was first organized as the 61st Reconnaissance Squadron in 1947 in the reserve at Hamilton Field, California, but it is unclear whether or not the unit had any assigned aircraft of personnel. It was inactivated in 1949 due to budgetary reductions. The squadron was reactivated at Little Rock in 1955 as the 61st Strategic Reconnaissance Squadron. It changed to become a bombardment unit in the fall of 1961.

== History ==
=== Reserve operations ===
The 61st Reconnaissance Squadron was organized in 1947 in the reserve at Hamilton Field, California, but it is unclear whether or not the unit had any assigned aircraft of personnel. It was inactivated in 1949 due to budgetary reductions.

== Strategic Air Command ==
Reactivated under Strategic Air Command in 1955 as an RB-47 Stratojet squadron flying strategic reconnaissance missions to meet SAC's global reconnaissance commitments from October 1955 – 1962, but on a reduced scale after February 1958 when events showed the vulnerability of the RB-47 and the development of the U-2 aircraft. Converted to standard B-47 medium bombers in late 1961 but inactivated in 1962 prior to becoming combat ready.

== Lineage ==
- Constituted as the 61st Reconnaissance Squadron, Weather Scouting

Activated in the Reserves on 26 March 1947
Redesignated 61st Reconnaissance Squadron, Photographic c. 11 November 1948
Inactivated on 27 Jun 1949
Redesignated 61st Strategic Reconnaissance Squadron, Medium on 14 January 1955
Activated on 24 January 1955
Redesignated 61st Bombardment Squadron, Medium on 25 January 1961
Inactivated on 25 June 1962

=== Assignments ===
- Fourteenth Air Force, 26 March 1947
- 70th Reconnaissance Group, 1 October 1947 – 27 June 1949
- 70th Strategic Reconnaissance Wing (later 70th Bombardment Wing), 24 January 1955 – 25 June 1962

=== Stations ===
- Hill Air Force Base, Utah, 26 April 1947 – 27 June 1949
- Little Rock Air Force Base, Arkansas, 24 January 1955 – 25 June 1962

=== Aircraft ===
- Boeing RB-47 Stratojet, 1955–1961
- Boeing B-47 Stratojet, 1961–1962

=== Awards ===
- Air Force Outstanding Unit Award
