= Emblems of the United States Air Force =

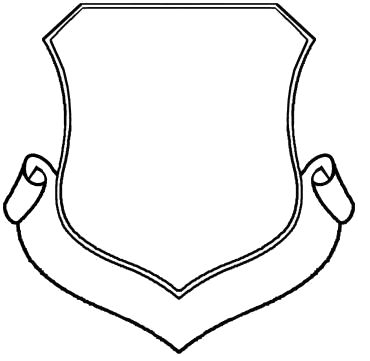
Shield for Air Force group and above emblems

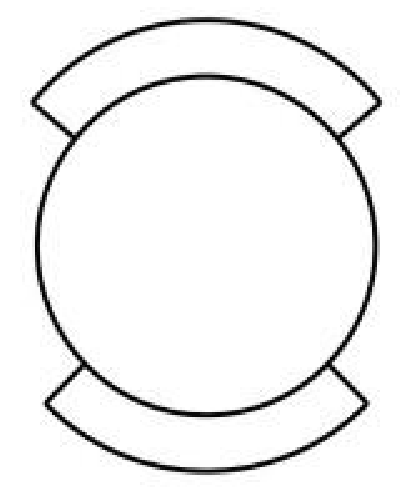
Disc for Air Force squadron emblems

United States Air Force unit emblems have their origin in four different types of insignia used since the early twentieth century by United States Army units. Although the Army continues to distinguish among the different types of unit insignia it uses, the Air Force describes them all as “emblems.”

Air Force unit emblems may be of one of two differing shapes, a disc or a shield of a prescribed shape. Squadrons and flights (and equivalents) display their emblems on circular discs while groups or higher echelons display theirs on shields. Some squadron emblems which were approved under earlier rules were formerly allowed to retain their original shape, even if they did not conform to this rule, which has been in effect since the 1960s. However, in the 1990s, all unit emblems were altered to conform to this rule and as units become active the earlier shapes are conformed to the disc or shield or replaced.

== Forebears of Air Force emblems ==
The four Army insignia types from which Air Force emblems are derived are:

- Aircraft Markings
- Distinctive Unit Insignia
- Coats of Arms
- Shoulder Sleeve Insignia

== Aircraft Markings ==
The earliest of the four types of insignia used by flying units was the Aircraft Marking. The American Expeditionary Forces in France issued the first official authorization for Aircraft Markings in November 1918, although they had been used earlier. There was no specified shape for Aircraft Markings, nor were there many restrictions concerning their themes. Their color and design, however, was required to be such as to render them easily visible at a distance to another aircraft. Each combat squadron had its own individual marking, applied to its airplanes.

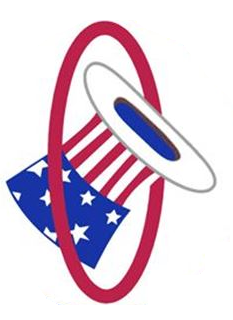
94th Aero Squadron aircraft marking

In the Zone of Advance, the Air Service, American Expeditionary Forces prescribed markings for its aircraft. The national insignia appeared on the wings and the tails of Air Service aircraft, following the French style. Also following the French style, the fuselage was reserved for an aircraft number (in squadron) and a squadron marking. Probably the most famous of these squadron markings were the Hat in the Ring of the 94th Aero Squadron and the Sioux Indian Head of the 103rd Aero Squadron. The 103d Aero Squadron was formed by former members of a French unit, the Lafayette Escadrille (Escadrille N.124), which used the identical marking on the fuselages of its planes. The Escadron de Chasse 2/4 La Fayette of French Armée de l'Air is descended from Escadrille N.124 and continued to use the Sioux Indian Head emblem on its planes.

Squadron aircraft markings of the 5th Pursuit Group
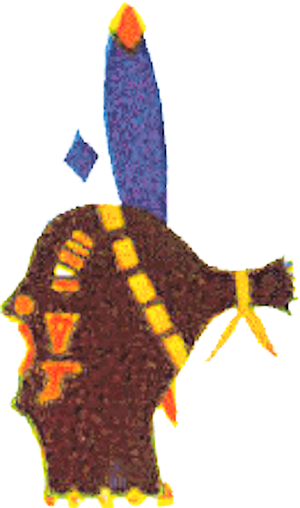
28th Aero Squadron

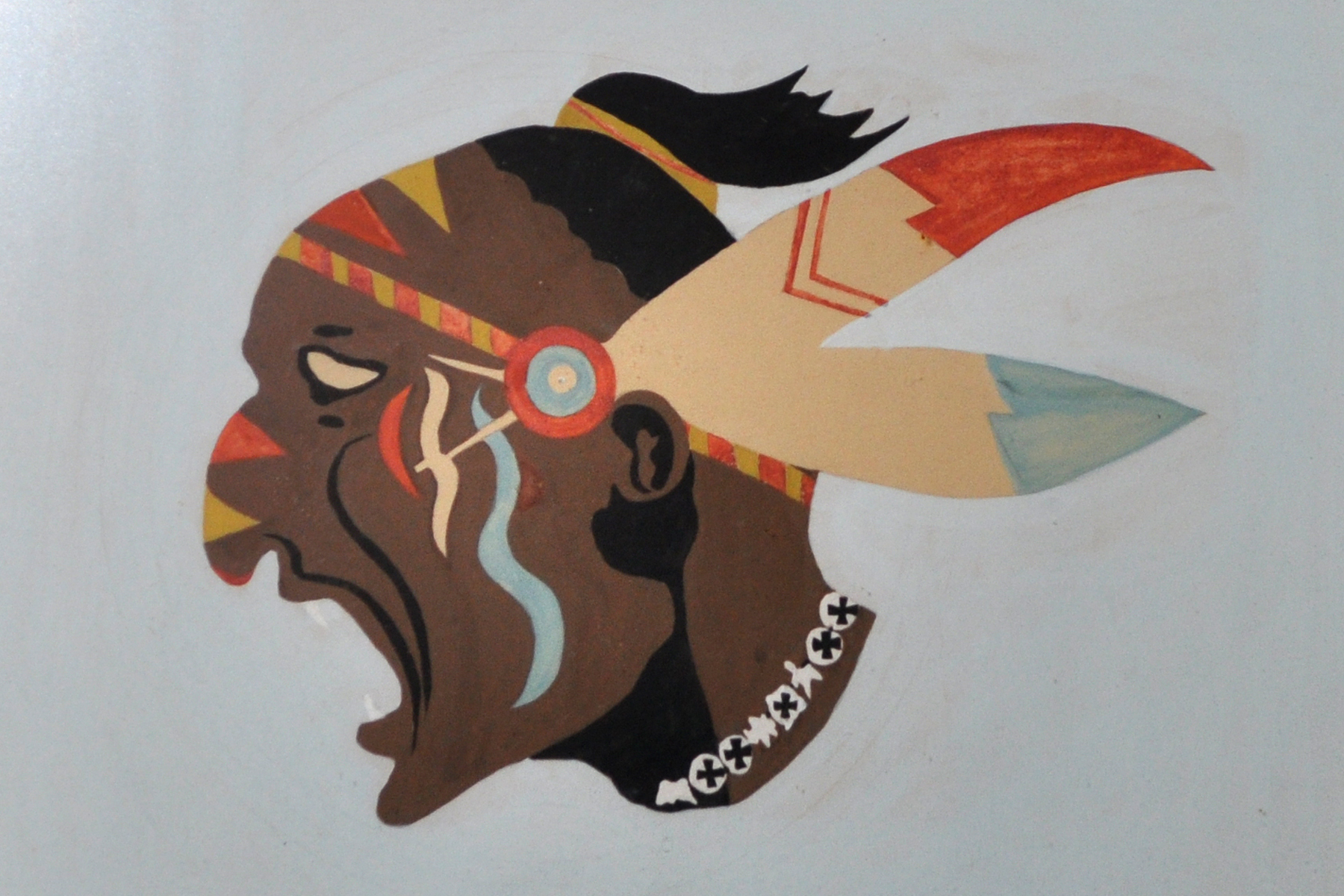
93rd Aero Squadron

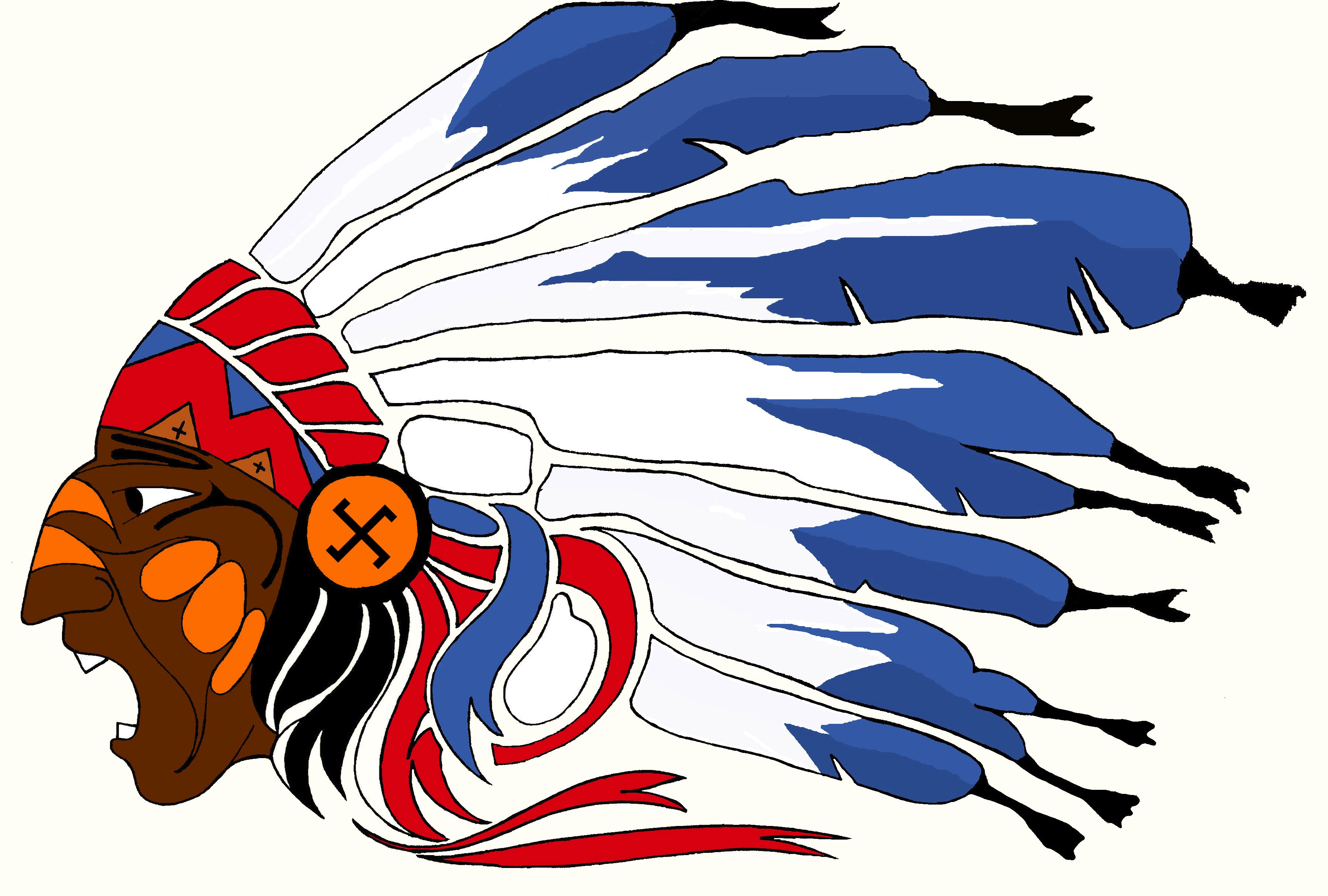
103rd Aero Squadron

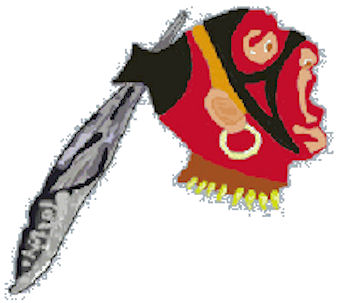
213th Aero Squadron

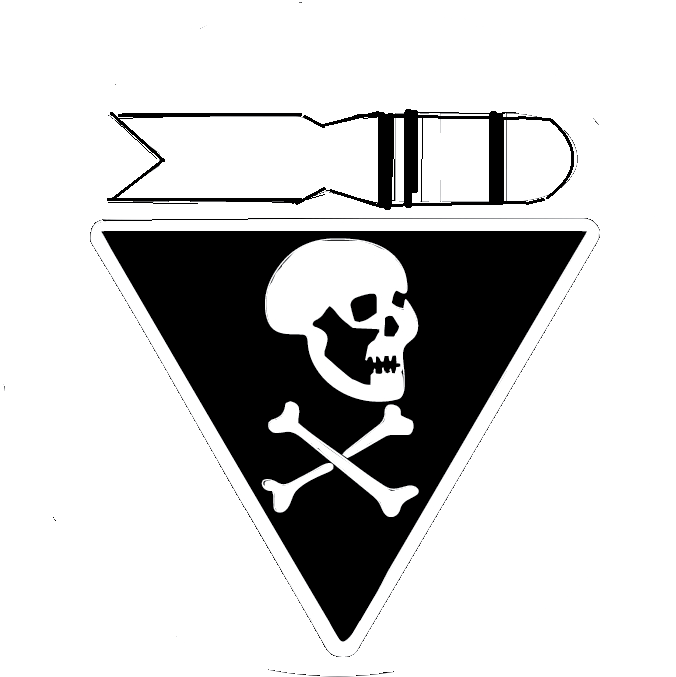
31st Aero Squadron aircraft marking

Because the purpose of Aircraft Markings was to distinguish friend from foe in combat, the American Expeditionary Forces limited its approval of aircraft markings to squadrons which had served at the front (however briefly), approving 45 of these on 18 November 1918. However, other flying squadrons were directed to adopt markings for their planes while training. Markings for units that did not enter combat were not officially approved. For example, the skull and crossbones on a black triangle of the 31st Aero Squadron, a training unit, was the basis for the emblem approved in 1934 for the 31st Bombardment Squadron (today’s 31st Test & Evaluation Squadron). An interesting attempt to standardize markings was made by the 5th Pursuit Group. Patterning its squadron markings after the 103rd Aero Squadron’s Sioux head, each of the other squadrons of the group adopted Indian head markings, supposedly of various tribes. Two of these markings can be seen today in the emblems of the 28th and 93rd Bomb Squadrons. As the flying squadrons of the American Expeditionary Forces were demobilized, the November 1918 approval for their markings ended.

1st Squadron emblems
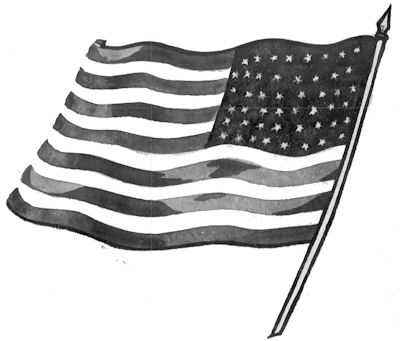
World War I emblem of the 1st Aero Squadron

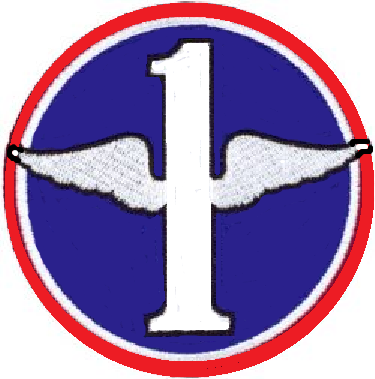
1st Observation Squadron 1920s emblem

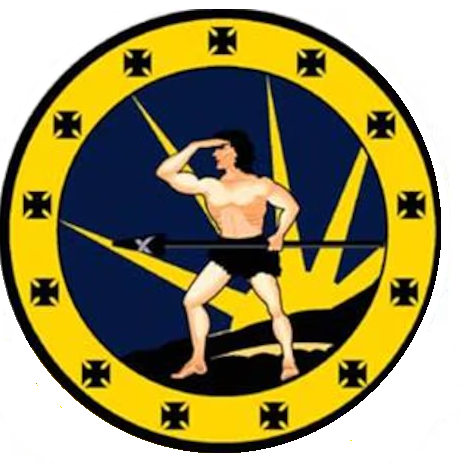
1931 emblem of the 1st Observation Squadron

In early 1924, many Air Service squadrons readopted the aircraft markings they had used as aero aquadrons of the American Expeditionary Forces in identical or modified form. Other Air Service squadrons adopted new markings, either because they did not like their World War I markings, or had no approved markings during the war. (Note: An exception was the 94th Pursuit Squadron, which could not use its World War I emblem, because it had been copyrighted as the trade mark of the Rickenbacker Automobile company). Examples of usage of American Expeditionary Forces markings were the 9th Bombardment Squadron’s adoption of the searchlights forming an IX used by the 9th Aero Squadron. Some other changes were forced by the new regulations concerning aircraft markings. For example, the official emblems of the United States were now prohibited, including the flag. This forced the 1st Observation Squadron to find a new emblem to replace the waving American flag it had used as the 1st Aero Squadron. After a brief time using a winged numeral 1, it adopted a caveman in front of a rising sun to show its position as the oldest squadron in the Air Corps.

"Hidden" numbers in emblems
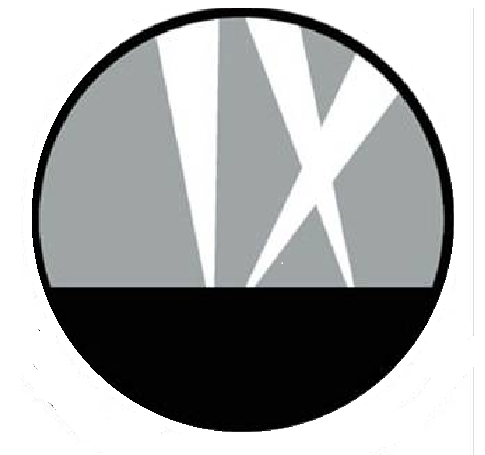
9th Bombardment Squadron emblem

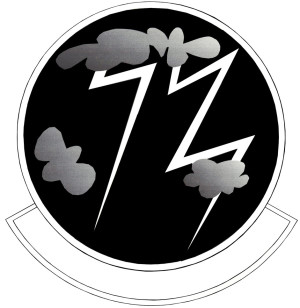
72nd Bombardment Squadron emblem

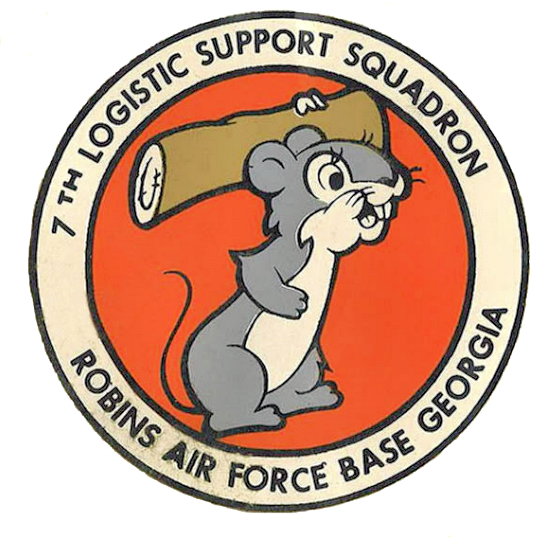
7th Logistic Support Squadron emblem

The winged numeral 1 the 1st Observation Squadron used in the early 1920’s was now also out of favor, for using a number as part of a marking was now banned. Some squadrons evaded this prohibition by cleverly disguising the number, as with the already mentioned searchlight beams of the 9th Bombardment Squadron, or the lightning flashes forming a “72” used by the 72nd Bombardment Squadron. Other squadrons used such devices as the number of pips on a pair of dice or arrangements of stars or other small objects to show the squadron’s number. Perhaps the cleverest hidden number in a squadron emblem was adopted years later by the 7th Logistic Support Squadron. The emblem showed a chipmunk supporting a log (a pun on the name, for the squadron was commonly called the 7th Log). A closer look showed that the log and chipmunk also formed a number 7.

== Coats of Arms ==
Coats of Arms as displayed on unit flags
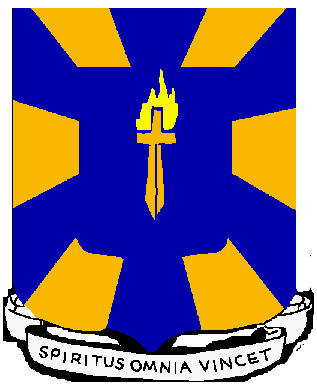
12th Bombardment Group

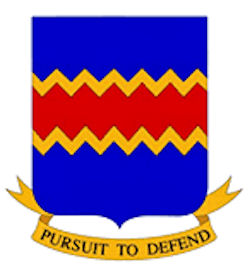
55th Fighter Group

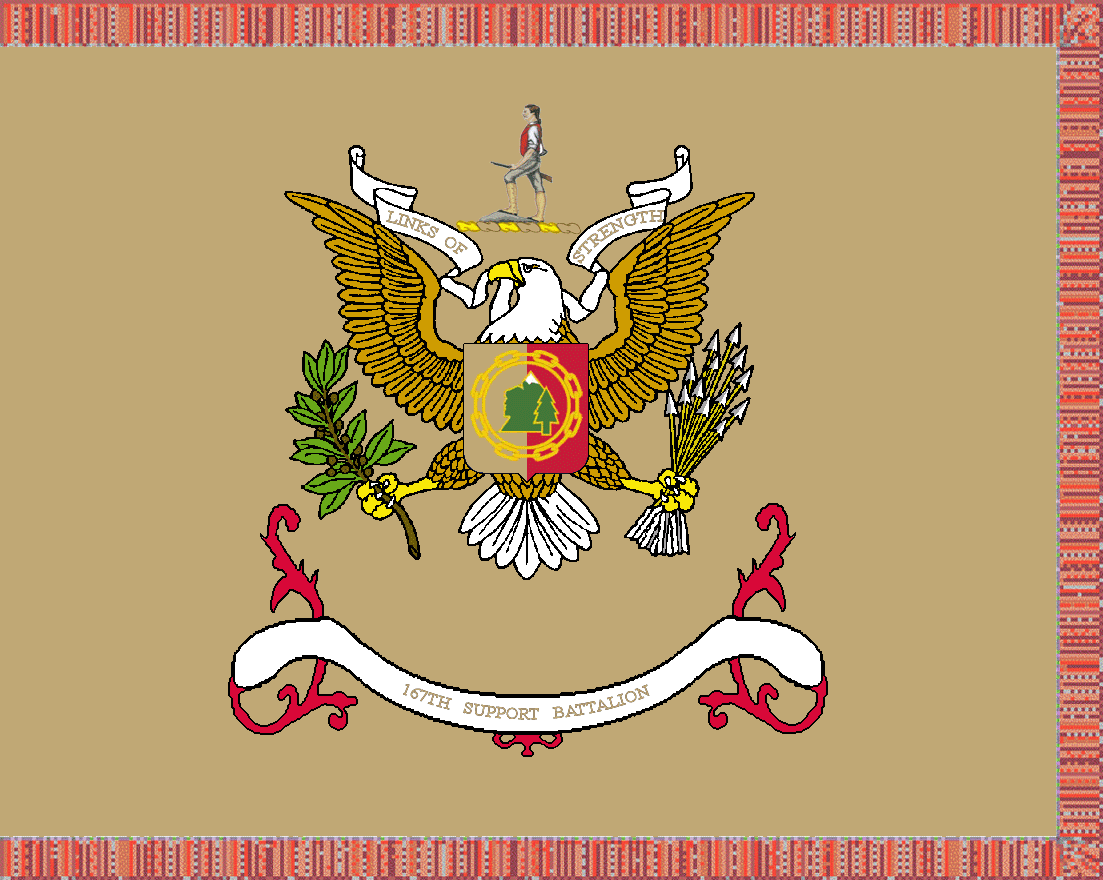
Army unit flag showing position of the unit coat of arms, crest and motto.

In 1920, a second type of Army insigne began to apply to flying units. This was the formal coat of arms which was displayed on the flag of a unit. Flags were originally used only by regiments, but now groups (which were at the same organizational level as regiments) were also entitled to flags and a coat of arms to be depicted on them. The Army generically referred to these units as color bearing units. The coats of arms were governed by rigid rules. Their shape was dictated by the flag (or color), which was a flag with a coat of arms centered on it, identical in shape to the arms of the United States. In place of the red, white and blue United States shield on the breast of the bald eagle was the unit’s own arms. Over the eagle’s head was displayed the unit’s crest (if one had been authorized), replacing the clouds and stars of the United States crest.

Emblems in the original Air Service colors
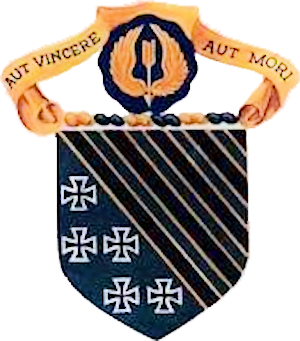
1st Pursuit Group DUI

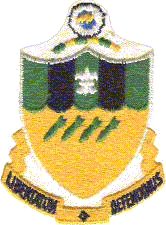
2nd Bombardment Group DUI

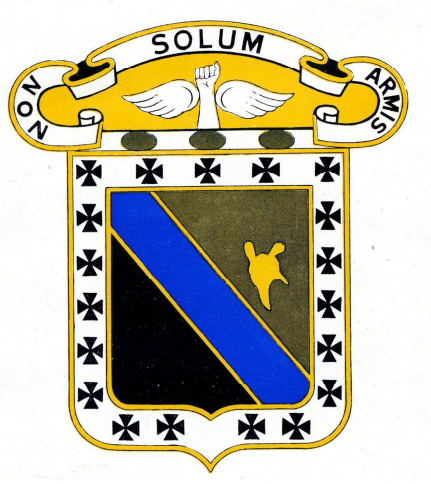
3rd Attack Group DUI

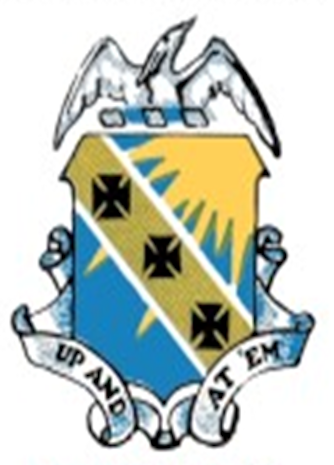
4th Composite Group DUI

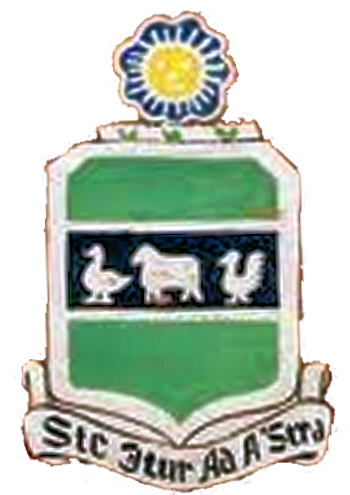
21st Airship Group DUI

Coats of Arms followed strict rules of heraldry. They used many of the charges used on noble European arms. New symbols were adopted to show unit service in various theaters. Among the early coats of arms, service in the Mexican Border Expedition might be shown by a cactus. World War I service against Germany’s air forces was commonly shown by the Iron Cross emblem used on German aircraft. Colors were also regulated. The army required that the primary colors of the coat of arms be those of the branch or service to which the unit belonged. The initial colors assigned to the Air Service were green and black and these colors are used on the first authorized coats of arms, those for the 1st Pursuit Group (today’s 1st Operations Group), 2nd Bombardment Group (today’s 2d Operations Group), 3rd Attack Group (today’s 3d Operations Group), 4th Composite Group (now disbanded), 5th Composite Group (today’s 5th Operations Group), 9th Observation Group (today’s 9th Operations Group), and 21st Airship Group (now disbanded). Branch colors for the Air Corps changed to Ultramarine Blue and Golden Orange. These continue to be the colors of the USAF and have been required as primary colors for emblems, although they are sometimes replaced by a lighter blue and yellow.

== Distinctive Unit Insignia ==
Distinctive Unit Insignia (DUI)
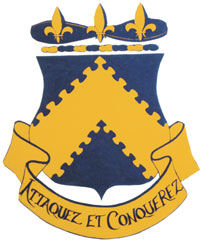
8th Pursuit Group DUI based on coat of arms with crest

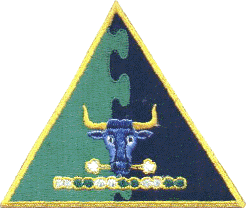
5th Composite Group DUI based on crest

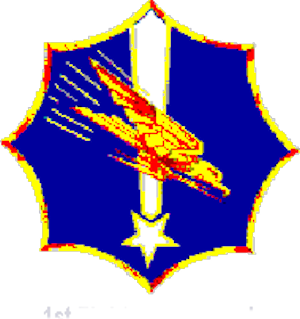
I Fighter Command DUI independent design

In addition to coats of arms, groups and some higher organizations were authorized Distinctive Unit Insignia (DUI or DI). These were enameled metal pins worn on uniform shoulder straps and garrison caps. (Note: The earliest use of these were on mess jackets. Since the Air Force became a separate service, Army directives on their use has changed.) Most groups adopted Distinctive Unit Insignia based on their coats of arms, with or without their crests. This was not a requirement, nor did the arms have to be the shape required for display on the unit flag. For example the 1st and 8th Pursuit Groups adopted Distinctive Unit Insignia of shields of entirely different shape than their official arms. The 5th and 6th Composite Groups adopted Distinctive Unit Insignia based on the groups’ crests (a blue bulls head and a pirate torso, respectively) rather than their arms. The 2nd Bombardment Wing (Note: This wing is now disbanded and is not related to the 2nd Bomb Wing.) and 18th Composite Wing adopted Distinctive Unit Insignia in other forms of heraldic badges.

== Shoulder Sleeve Insignia ==
Shoulder Sleeve Insignia (SSI)
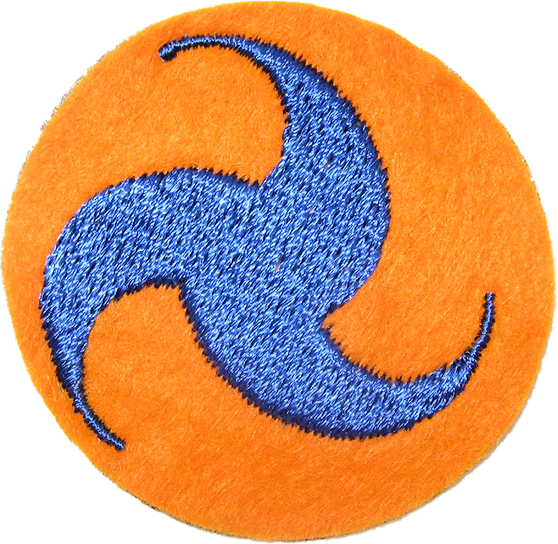
General Headquarters Air Force SSI

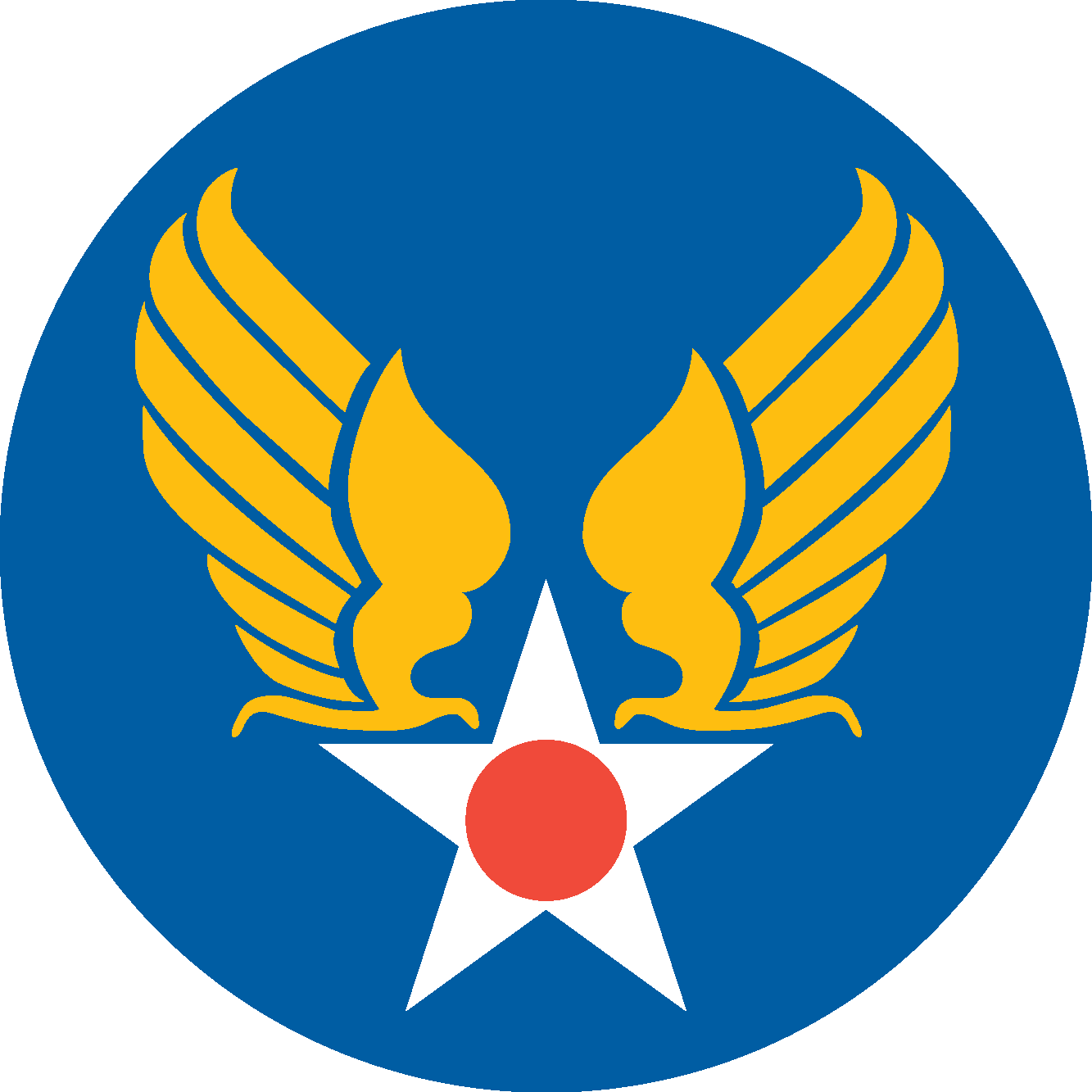
Army Air Forces SSI

As the Air Corps grew larger in preparation for World War II, it formed units larger than wings. In accordance with Army policy, these units were authorized a fourth form of insignia, the Shoulder Sleeve Insignia (SSI). (Note: The first Shoulder Sleeve Insigne approved for an Air Corps unit was for General Headquarters Air Force in 1937. Brief History of USAF Organizational Emblems.) Most Shoulder Sleeve Insignia were circular or had curved tops to fit the top of the uniform sleeve, where they were worn. These shoulder insignia were adopted by the numbered air forces, commands, and the Army Air Forces itself. Rules governing these insignia were not the same as for other insignia. For example, the use of the unit number was rather encouraged than prohibited, as shown by the winged 8 of Eighth Air Force or the 10 in a winged shield of Tenth Air Force. In fact, a majority of the Numbered Air Forces used their number as part of their Shoulder Sleeve Insignia. From 1945 through 1950 arcs containing the name of commands were approved for wear over the Army Air Forces Shoulder Sleeve Insigne.

== Development of current system ==
United States Air Force flag

After the Air Force gained independence, it merged these four types of identifying marks. It soon abolished the weaning of both Shoulder Sleeve Insignia and DUIs under its “Plain Blue Suit” uniform policy. Flags for Air Force units were similar to Army flags except for the form of the coat of arms in the center. The Air Force uses a shield with curved sides and the eagle is no longer a supporter of the shield, but is an element of the crest. The entire display of arms is surrounded by a ring of 13 stars.

Shoulder Sleeve Insignia altered to fit Air Force shield
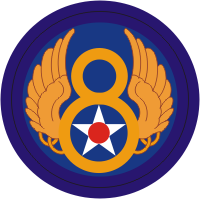
Eighth Air Force SSI

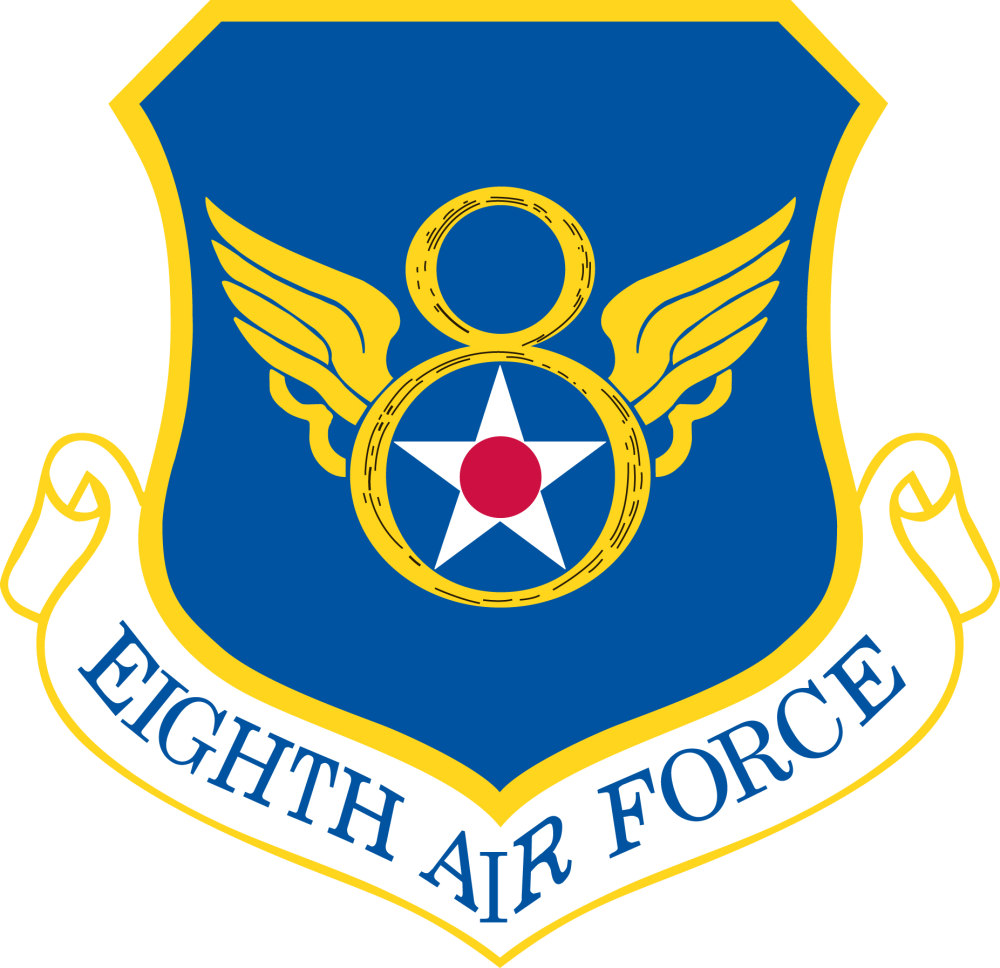
Eighth Air Force SSI expanded to fill USAF shield

Fifteenth Air Force SSI

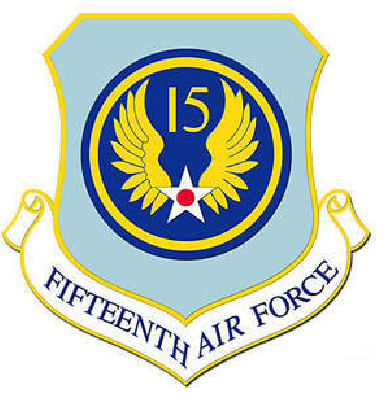
Fifteenth Air Force SSI placed on USAF shield (Note: This emblem was replaced in 1994 by a version with the SSI expanded to fit the shield.)

Because the new form of flag provided that the eagle on a cloud was the crest for all units, higher echelons were no longer authorized separate crests as part of their arms. In addition, the shield was now the authorized form for emblems for all units higher than groups, including those that had used Shoulder Sleeve Insignia in the Army. These were originally termed "heraldic" emblems. Headquarters previously authorized Shoulder Sleeve Insignia either adopted entirely new emblems (like Second Air Force, which replaced its eagle with a winged 2, while assigned to Strategic Air Command); expanded its former emblem to reach the edges of the shield (like Eighth Air Force); or placed its shoulder sleeve insigne in the center of a shield (like Fifteenth Air Force, while assigned to Strategic Air Command).

Because the AF adopted a new structure in which the wing, rather than the group, was the primary tactical headquarters, starting in 1947 it formed new wings with the same number of its existing combat groups, which were assigned to the wing along with an Air Base Group, a Maintenance & Supply Group, and a Medical Group. The wings use of the groups’ emblems was eventually officially recognized (Note: An exception was the 7th Bombardment Wing, which placed the shield of the 7th Bombardment Group, and an eagle on a larger shield. Ravenstein, p. 18.). With exceptions, the component groups use the wing emblem with the group designation on the scroll.

Between 15 March 1991 and 3 Sep 1992 Air Force Chief of Staff, General Merrill A. McPeak personally reviewed each and every emblem of combat units. His goals were to restore original insignia to units that had lost or become disassociated with their original insignia. He also limited the number of design elements to three.

The first restriction on what became emblems was issued in 1923 and required that they be "dignified and in good taste." Emblems for groups and higher organizations were described as "heraldic" and were required to be placed on a shield. Squadron emblems were described as "pictorial" in 1955, but a specific shape was not required. New designs were to "avoid offending the Air Force, federal agencies, nations, state, or religious bodies They must also be in good taste and simple.” These restrictions applied only to newly approved emblems. However, if previously approved emblems were modified, the modification was required to comply with the new standard. During World War II, a number of units adopted emblems using cartoon characters. (Note: This was not new. The 11th Aero Squadron emblem of World War I, depicted Jiggs, of Maggie and Jiggs, carrying a bomb.) this practice was banned for "heraldic" emblems in 1964.

The shape of "pictorial" emblems was standardized as disc shaped in 1966. Irregularly shaped emblems had already been placed on discs on patches worn on uniforms. At the time, placing an approved emblem on a disc was not considered a new or changed design requiring approval.

Prohibitions included showing a specific type of aircraft or equipment; imitating other designs like flags, religious symbols, and medals; displaying symbols "of a morbid nature" or games of chance; or containing numerals or identifiable maps. These rules applied only for new emblems Later, depictions of specific landmarks were added to the prohibitions.

Designs were required to include a minimum number of colors. The use of Air Force (ultramarine) blue and Air Force (golden) yellow was later encouraged, and for a time their use as the primary colors of the emblem was required. The 1959 revision to emblem standards for the first time prohibited an organization from using an emblem approved for a different organization. (Note: This requirement has been ignored or waived in a few cases, most notably by the use of the emblems approved for Air Combat Command and Air Mobility Command, which had been approved for Tactical Air Command and Military Air Transport Service.)

Disc shaped emblems may have two scrolls, one on top and one on bottom. The first rule describing their permitted the unit designation on either the top or bottom scroll with the motto appearing on the other. However this was later changed to require the unit designation to appear on the bottom scroll.

== See also ==
- USAAF unit identification aircraft markings
- Military aircraft insignia
- Origin of coats of arms
- Insignia
