= List of United States Air Force weapons squadrons =

The Weapons Squadrons are units of the United States Air Force, in most cases attached to the USAF Weapons School at Nellis Air Force Base. Each unit specializes in a particular type of combat aircraft.

== List of Weapons Squadrons ==
Squadron	Shield	Location	Specialty area	Note
6th Weapons Squadron		Nellis AFB	F-35A	
8th Weapons Squadron		Nellis AFB	JSTARS/E-3	
14th Weapons Squadron		Hurlburt Field	Special Operations Forces	
16th Weapons Squadron		Nellis AFB	F-16	
17th Weapons Squadron		Nellis AFB	F-15E	
19th Weapons Squadron		Nellis AFB	Intelligence	
26th Weapons Squadron		Creech AFB	MQ-9	
29th Weapons Squadron		Little Rock AFB	C-130	
34th Weapons Squadron		Nellis AFB	HH-60	
57th Weapons Squadron		McGuire AFB	C-17	
64th Fighter Weapons Squadron		Nellis AFB	F-5E	Redesignated 64th Tactical Fighter Training Aggressor Squadron
65th Fighter Weapons Squadron		Nellis AFB	F-100	Redesignated 65th Tactical Fighter Training Aggressor Squadron, inactive
66th Weapons Squadron		Nellis AFB	A-10	
77th Weapons Squadron		Dyess AFB	B-1B	
83d Fighter Weapons Squadron				Combat Archer
86th Fighter Weapons Squadron				Combat Hammer
315th Weapons Squadron		Nellis AFB	Minuteman III	
325th Weapons Squadron		Whiteman AFB	B-2	
328th Weapons Squadron		Nellis AFB	Space/ICBM	
340th Weapons Squadron		Barksdale AFB	B-52	
417th Weapons Squadron		Holloman AFB	F-117	Inactivated 2006
433d Weapons Squadron		Nellis AFB	F-15, F-22	
509th Weapons Squadron		Fairchild AFB	KC-135	
715th Weapons Squadron		Whiteman AFB	B-2	Inactive
4537th Fighter Weapons Squadron		Nellis AFB	F-105	

== See also ==
- United States Air Force Weapons School

== See also ==
- List of United States Air Force squadrons
