= USAF Weapons School =

US military training center

U.S. Air Force Weapons School
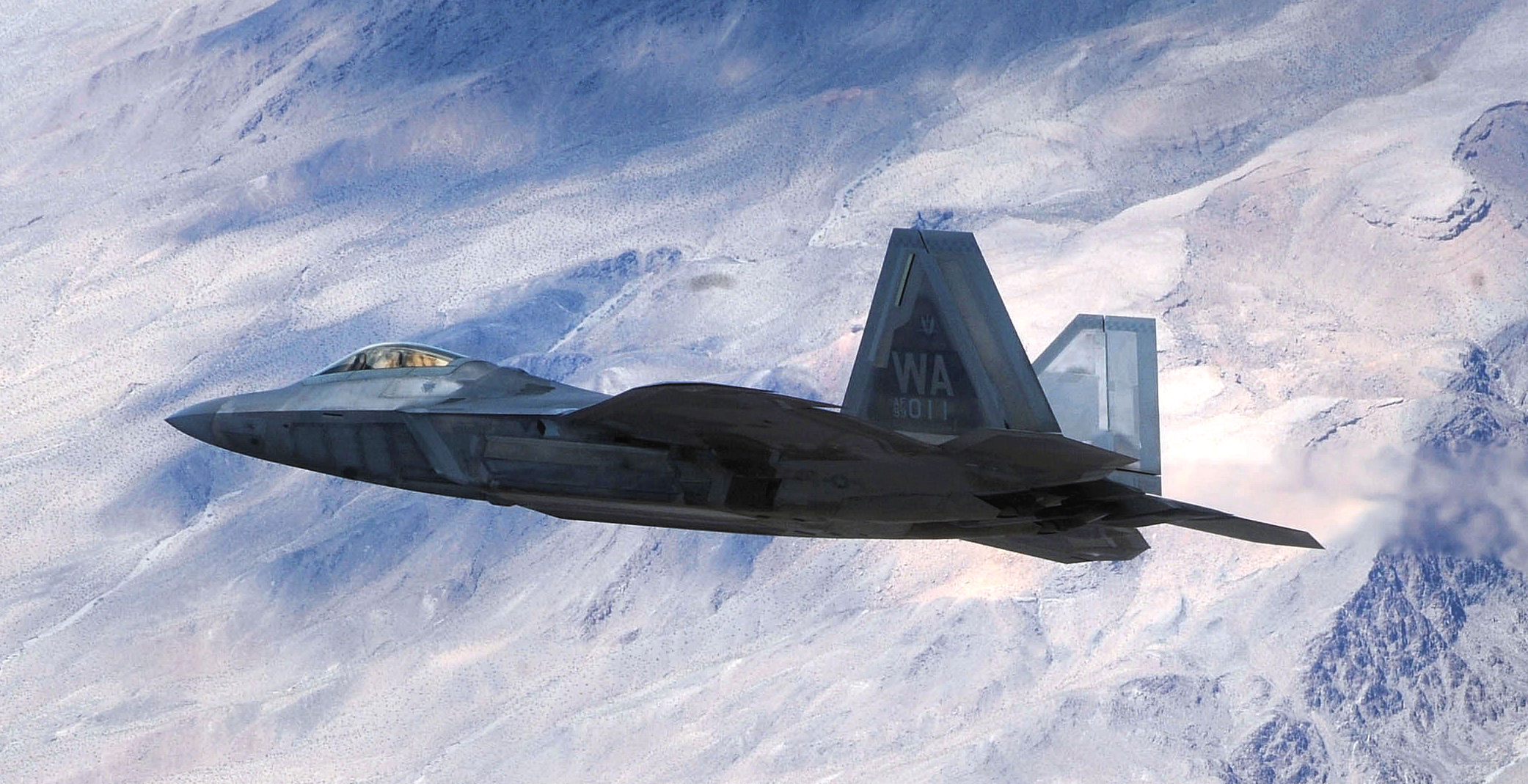
- F-22A Raptor assigned to the USAF Weapons School's 433d Weapons Squadron
- Active: 1949–present
- Country: United States
- Branch: United States Air Force; United States Space Force
- Type: Training School
- Part of: Air Combat Command; Space Training and Readiness Command
- Garrison/HQ: Nellis Air Force Base
- Decorations: Air Force Outstanding Unit Award Air Force Organizational Excellence Award

Insignia
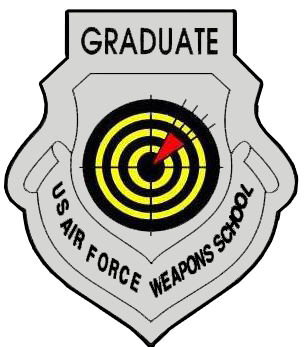
- U.S. Air Force Weapons School Graduate Patch

The USAF Weapons School is a unit of the United States Air Force and United States Space Force, assigned to the 57th Wing and Space Delta 1. It is located at Nellis AFB, Nevada.

== Mission ==
The mission of the USAF Weapons School is to teach graduate-level instructor courses, which provide advanced training in weapons and tactics employment to officers of the combat air forces. The USAF Weapons School is headquartered at Nellis Air Force Base in Nevada with detachments at Dyess Air Force Base, Texas, Hurlburt Field, Florida, Little Rock Air Force Base, Arkansas, Whiteman Air Force Base, Missouri, Holloman Air Force Base, New Mexico, Fairchild Air Force Base, Washington, McChord Field, Washington, and Barksdale Air Force Base, Louisiana.

The Weapons School accomplishes its mission by providing graduate-level, instructor academic and flying courses to USAF Combat Air Forces (CAF) and Mobility Air Forces (MAF). It conducts extensive technical off-station training and is a liaison with CAF and MAF units. It publishes the quarterly USAF Weapons Review with worldwide readership. All positions are selectively filled.

The Weapons School's squadrons include the Weapons Instructor Courses for the following aircraft and systems: Air Battle Manager, A-10 Thunderbolt II, Lockheed AC-130, B-1 Lancer, B-2 Spirit, B-52 Stratofortress, C-17 Globemaster III, C-130 Hercules, Control Reporting Center EC-130H Compass Call, F-15C Eagle, F-15E Strike Eagle, F-16 Fighting Falcon, F-22A Raptor, F-35 Lightning II, Joint Terminal Attack Controller, Weapons Director, MQ-9 Reaper, HC-130J Combat King II, HH-60 Pave Hawk, KC-135 Stratotanker, MC-130, RC-135 Rivet Joint, U-2 Dragon Lady, Intelligence, Space, ICBM, and Cyber.

== History ==
=== Origins ===
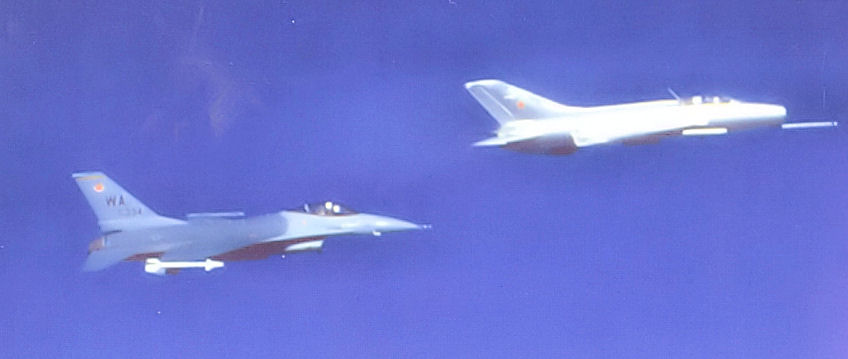
USAF Fighter Weapons School F-16 flying with a Constant Peg MiG-21 over the Nevada desert, about 1986

The USAF Weapons School traces its roots to the Aircraft Gunnery School established in 1949 at Las Vegas Air Force Base (which became Nellis Air Force Base in 1950). This organization brought together a cadre of World War II combat veterans dedicated to teaching the next generation of pilots. The Gunnery School converted to combat crew training to meet the needs of the Korean War. In January 1954, the school assumed the mission of training fighter instructors, and took on the title, "USAF Fighter Weapons School." Students at Nellis trained in P-51 Mustang, F-80 Shooting Star, F-84 Thunderjet and all versions of the F-100 Super Sabre aircraft during this period. By 1960, the F-100 and the F-105 Thunderchief were left as the two primary aircraft flown at the Weapons School.

=== Vietnam era ===
In 1965, the Fighter Weapons School added the F-4 Phantom II to its courses. As the roles of fighter aircraft expanded during the Vietnam War, the Fighter Weapons School began to have an impact across the larger Air Force. Many of the air-to-ground and air-to-air innovations of this period can be traced to the Weapons School. Assigned aircraft continued to change in concert with Air Force inventories. The Weapons School deactivated the F-100 and F-105 courses, and added the F-111 and A-7D Corsair II.

=== Post–Vietnam War era ===
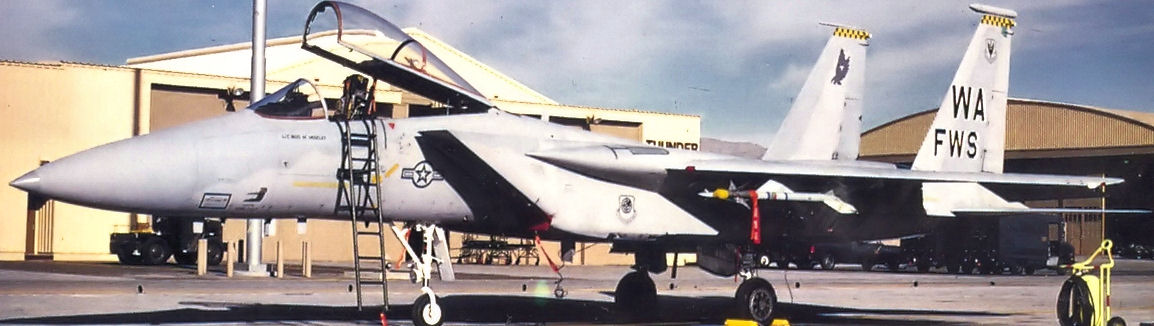
F-15 Division F-15C 82-0038

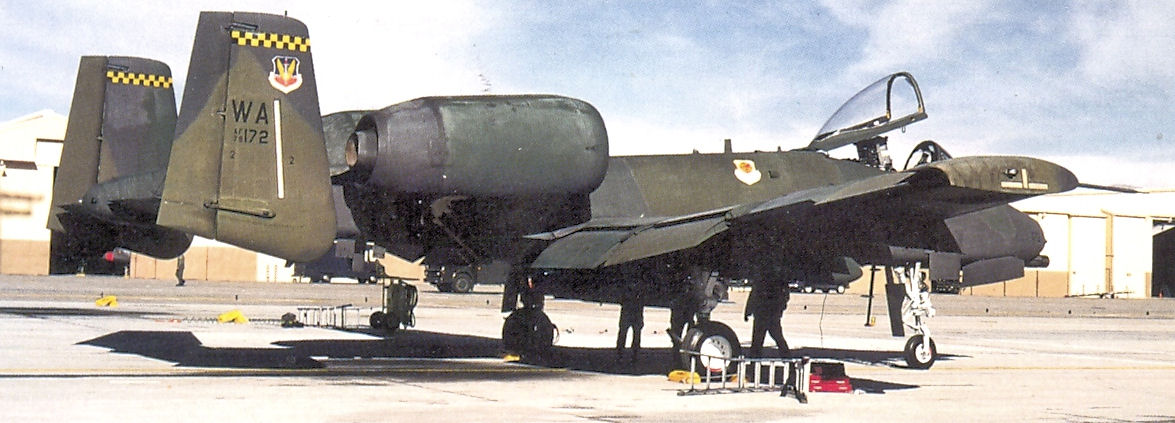
A-10 Division A-10A 79-0172

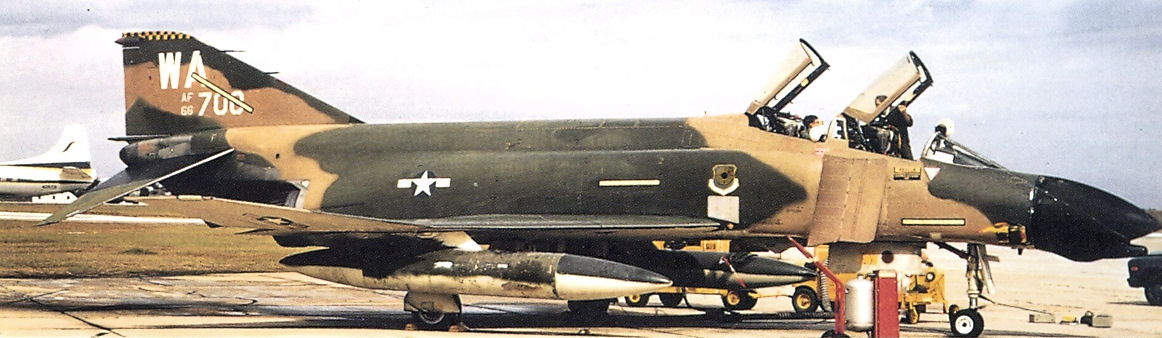
F-4 Division F-4D 66-8700

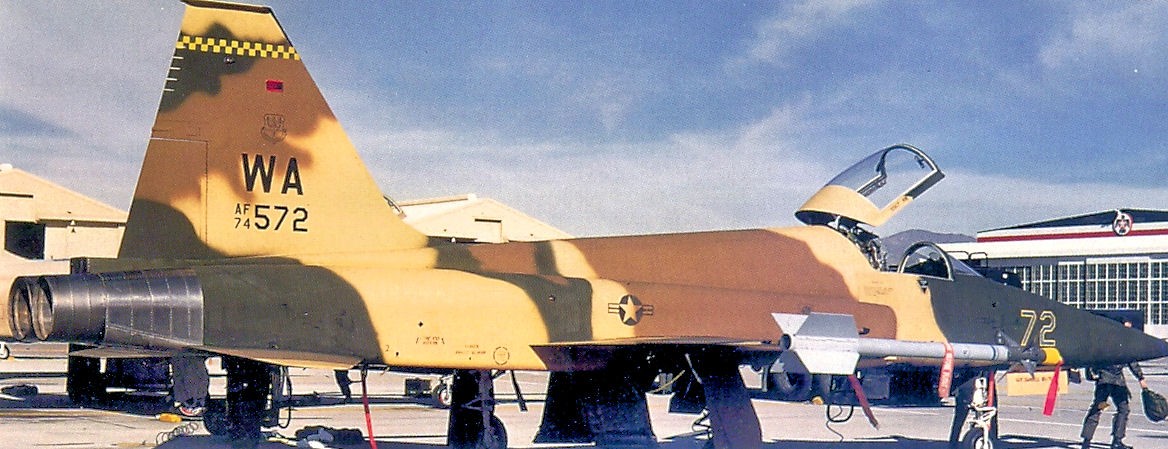
Aggressor Division F-5E 74-1572

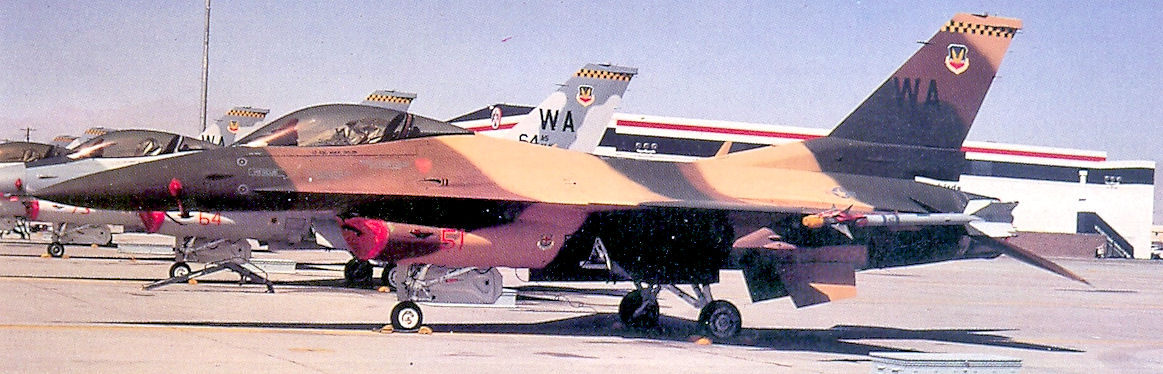
F-16 Division F-16C 86–0251 in experimental "Aggressor" motif

The Aggressors, flying the T-38 Talon and F-5E Tiger II were stood-up as part of the Weapons School in the early 1970s to improve air-to-air skills by providing accurate threat replication for dissimilar air combat training. The A-7D tenure in the school was a brief 3 years as the squadron transitioned from A-7s to F-5 Aggressors in 1975. Fighter modernization brought both the A-10 Thunderbolt II and the F-15 Eagle into Weapons School operations in 1977.

The 1980s ushered in a time of significant change for the Weapons School. In 1981, the school underwent a complete reorganization as the squadrons became divisions. The Aggressor squadrons transferred to the 57th Fighter Weapons Wing. The F-111 Division became a geographically separated detachment of the Nellis-based Weapons School. The newly formed F-16 Fighting Falcon Division graduated its first students in 1982. In 1984 the Weapons School expanded its courses beyond the traditional fighter aircrew, adding a course to train weapons controllers in the F-15 Division. A passing of the torch to the current Weapons School occurred when the last F-4 class graduated in 1985, ending 20 years of F-4 weapons officer training. The Air Weapons Controller Division, later known as the Command and Control Operations (CCO) Division activated as a separate unit in 1987. The school gained a Fighter Intelligence Officers Course in 1988 which became the graduate patch-awarding Intelligence Division in 1990. The F-15E Strike Eagle Division became part of the school in 1991.

=== Modern era ===
With the stand-up of Air Combat Command in 1992, the school embarked on a dramatic shift from its 43-year focus exclusively on fighter aviation, dropping the "fighter" from its title and becoming the "Air Force Weapons School." The change was much more than symbolic with the activation of the B-52 and B-1 Divisions that year. Rescue helicopters joined the school with the HH-60 Division in 1995 while the F-111 retired. That year also saw the addition of RC-135 RIVET JOINT and EC-130 COMPASS CALL courses to the CCO Division. To increase the graduate-level understanding of space and air integration for operators, the school added the Space Division in 1996.

With a growing need for weapons officers skilled at integrating all aspects of air and space power, the Weapons School has continued to expand. 2000 saw the addition of the E-8 JSTARS to the CCO Division. Special Operations Forces (SOF) also became part of the Weapons School in 2000, developing courses for the MH-53 and AC-130 and Stealth joined the school in 2002 with the addition of the F-117 and B-2 Divisions. SOF added an MC-130 course that year as well. In 2003, all of the Weapons School divisions were re-designated (or initially activated) as squadrons, and the Intelligence Sensor Weapons Instructor Course was added to provide graduate-level training in intelligence, surveillance, and reconnaissance integration. In 2006, the F-117 Weapons Instructor Course deactivated and the merger with the Mobility Weapons School added the C-130, KC-135, and C-17 Weapons Instructor Courses. In 2008, the F-22 joined the Weapons School and in 2009, the ICBM Weapons Instructor Course was added. In 2012, the Cyber Warfare Operations Weapons Instructor Course was founded and joined the space squadron. In 2019, the Weapons School added the U-2 Weapons Instructor Course. In 2020, the Weapons School added the Control Reporting Center Instructor Course under the 8th WPS which had previously been an Advanced Instructor Course for enlisted ground based controllers.

Today's Weapons School encompasses 21 squadrons, teaching 24 combat specialties at 9 locations. Only 30% of today's students come from the classic fighter specialties.

=== Lineage ===
- Constituted as USAF Fighter Weapons School, and activated, on 30 December 1965

Organized on 1 January 1966
Discontinued, and inactivated, on 1 September 1966

- Activated on 30 December 1981

Re-designated USAF Weapons School on 15 June 1993

=== Assignments ===
- Tactical Air Command, 30 December 1965
- 4520 Combat Crew Training Wing, 1 Jan-1 Sep 1966
- 57th Fighter Weapons (later, 57th Fighter; 57th) Wing, 30 Dec 1981–present

== Components ==
On 3 February 2003, the divisions of the USAF Weapons School formally became squadrons. Each of the new squadrons received the designation of a previously highly decorated notable inactivated unit.

Nellis-based units

Squadron	Date activated	Weapons System	Notes
6th Weapons Squadron	21 June 2017	F-35	
8th Weapons Squadron	3 February 2003	E-8C JSTARS/E-3/RC-135 RIVET JOINT/COMPASS CALL/Control Reporting Center	Utilizes CAF Aircraft. Originally was the Air Weapons Controller Division, activated on 21 June 1984
16th Weapons Squadron	3 February 2003	F-16 Fighting Falcon	Originally was the F-16 Division, established 1 October 1980
17th Weapons Squadron	3 February 2003	F-15E Strike Eagle	Originally was the F-15E Division, established 8 July 1991
19th Weapons Squadron	3 February 2003	Intelligence, U-2 Dragon Lady, RQ-4 Global Hawk	Activated in 1988 as the Fighter Intelligence Officer Course; became the Weapons School Intelligence Division in 1990. Graduates now include intelligence officers, as well as pilots of high-altitude ISR aircraft.
26th Weapons Squadron	30 September 2008	MQ-9	In 2015 the 26th Weapons Squadron stopped flying the Predator.
32d Weapons Squadron	28 June 2018	Cyber Warfare Operations	Activated in 2012, the Cyber Warfare Operations Weapons Instructor Course started under the 328th Weapons Squadron. In 2018, the Cyber course separated from the 328th Weapons Squadron. Graduates are experts in offensive and defensive cyber warfare and integrating cyber into USAF weapons systems.
34th Weapons Squadron	3 February 2003	HH-60 Pave Hawk	Originally was the Weapons School HH-60G Division. Had its beginning with the establishment of the USAF Combat Rescue School at Nellis AFB in 1993.
57th Weapons Support Squadron	3 February 2003	Mission Support	Non-flying organization. Originally was the Weapons School Support Division was activated on 1 October 1997
66th Weapons Squadron	3 February 2003	A-10 Thunderbolt II Joint Terminal Attack Controller (JTAC)	Initially was the 66th Fighter Weapons Squadron on 15 October 1969 equipped with A-7D Corsair IIs. When the Fighter Weapons School reorganized in 1981, the 66th FWS was redesignated as the A- 10 Division.
315th Weapons Squadron	2 March 2012	Minuteman III	Non-flying organization. Originally the 4315th Combat Crew Training Squadron. ICBM WIC originally was in 328th Weapons Squadron. ICBM WIC underwent validation Jan – Jun 2010 (Class 10A), and the first class started in Jul 2010 (10B).
328th Weapons Squadron	3 February 2003	Space Superiority	Non-flying organization. Originally was the Weapons School Space Division was activated in July 1996.
433d Weapons Squadron	3 February 2003	F-22A Raptor	Originally activated in 1981 as the 433rd Fighter Weapons Squadron. Became Weapons School F-15C Division when the USAF Fighter Weapons School redesignated each of its squadrons as "Divisions" in 1981. First F-22A received July 2010. The last F-15C class graduated in December 2021.
561st Weapons Squadron	16 July 2019		Previously was the 561st Joint Tactics Squadron assigned to 57th Wing.

Geographically separated units

Squadron	Station	Date activated	Weapons System	Notes
14th Weapons Squadron	Hurlburt Field, Florida	3 February 2003	Special Operations Aircraft (Various)	The Weapons School Special Operations Forces (SOF) Division first activated as Detachment 1, AFSOC/DO on 15 March 2000 at Hurlburt Field, Florida. The unit designation was changed to Detachment 1, 16th Operations Group on 10 August 2000 to align it with the group charged with providing aircraft and personnel who would help build the course.
29th Weapons Squadron	Little Rock AFB, Arkansas	1 June 2003	C-130 Hercules	Tactical airlift training. Was incorporated from the USAF Mobility Weapons School, 5 July 2006.
57th Weapons Squadron	McChord AFB, Washington	1 June 2003	C-17 Globemaster III	Strategic airlift training. Was incorporated from the USAF Mobility Weapons School, 5 July 2006.
77th Weapons Squadron	Dyess AFB, Texas	3 February 2003	B-1 Lancer	Tactical bombardment training. Initially activated as the Weapons School B-1 Division on 28 August 1992.
325th Weapons Squadron	Whiteman AFB, Missouri	9 September 2005	B-2 Spirit	Advanced stealth bomber training. Replaced 715th Weapons Squadron (13 August 2003 – 9 September 2005) Initially activated as the B-2 Division in May 2002
340th Weapons Squadron	Barksdale AFB, Louisiana	3 February 2003	B-52 Stratofortress	Strategic Bombardment training. Initially activated as the Weapons School B-52 Division on 1 October 1989.
509th Weapons Squadron	Fairchild AFB, Washington	1 June 2003	KC-135 Stratotanker	Aerial refueling training. Was incorporated from the USAF Mobility Weapons School, 5 July 2006.

Inactive units

- A-7D Division (1972–1981)
- F-4 Division (1972–1985)
- F-111 Division (1972–1992)
- 417th Weapons Squadron, F-117 Nighthawk, Holloman AFB, New Mexico
- 715th Weapons Squadron, B-2, Whiteman AFB, Missouri

=== Stations ===
- Nellis AFB, NV, 1 Jan – 1 Sep 1966; 30 Dec 1981 – present

== See also ==
- NAWDC (USN/USMC equivalent, delivering Naval Air Weapons Courses, including TOPGUN)
- ASWC (UK Royal Air Force equivalent, delivering the Qualified Weapons Instructor (QWI) courses.)
