= 340th Weapons Squadron =

340th Weapons Squadron

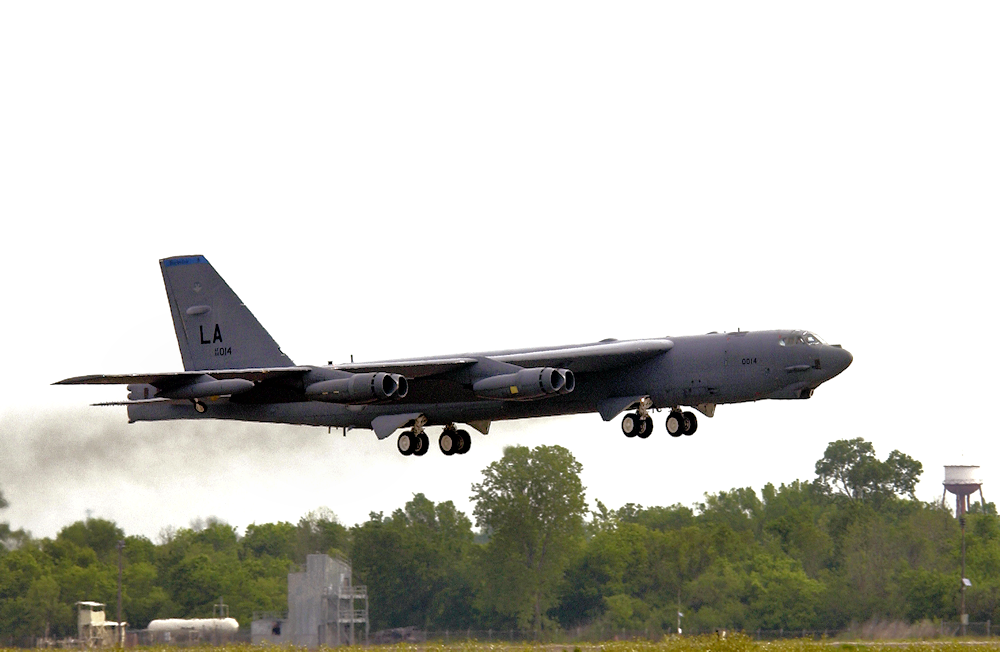
- Boeing B-52 taking off from Barksdale AFB
- Active: 1942-1945; 1946-1992; 2003-present
- Country: United States
- Branch: United States Air Force
- Type: Squadron
- Role: Advanced B-52 Stratofortress Training
- Part of: Air Combat Command
- Garrison/HQ: Barksdale Air Force Base, Louisiana
- Motto: Parati Tunc Simus (Latin for 'Let Us Then Be Prepared')
- Engagements: Antisubmarine Campaign; European Theater of Operations; Gulf War
- Decorations: Distinguished Unit Citation; Air Force Outstanding Unit Award

Commanders
- Notable commanders: Paul W. Tibbets

Insignia
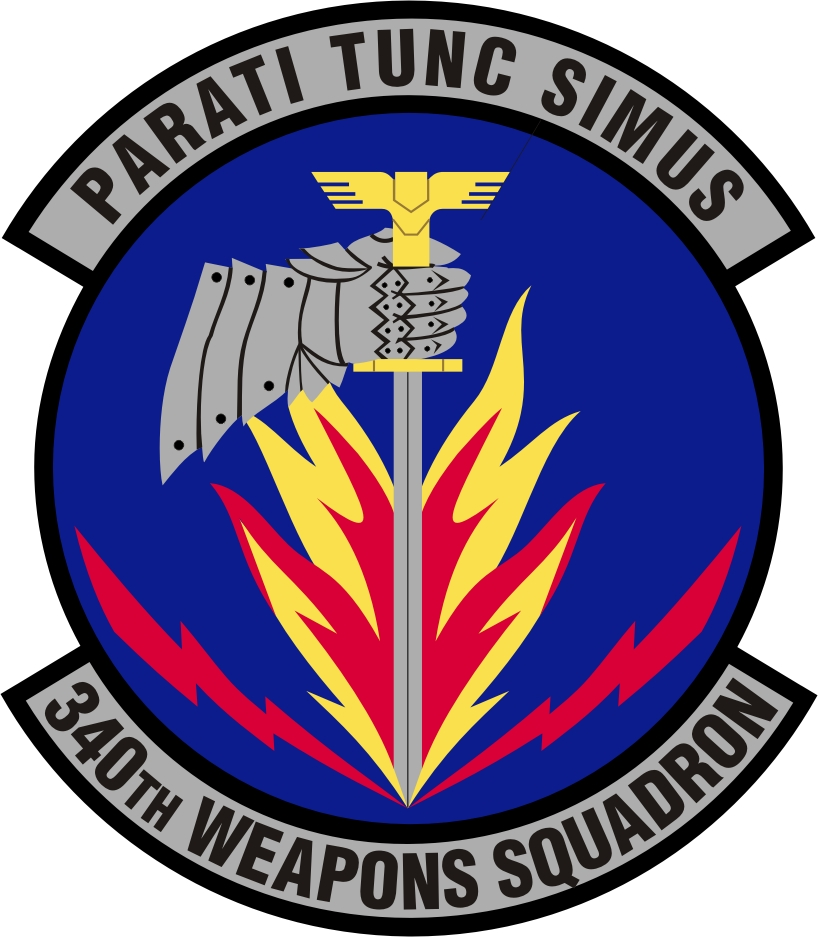
- 340th Weapons Squadron emblem (Note: Modified description: On a disc Azure, in dexter chief a gauntlet grasping a sword in pale, point to base Proper, detailed Sable, winged hilt and pommel Or, enflamed from point, of the same [color] and garnished Gules, all between two concave lightning flashes, one in dexter and one in sinister, emanating from point of the last [color], all within a narrow border Black. Significance: Ultramarine blue and Air Force yellow are the Air Force colors. Blue alludes to the sky, the primary theater of Air Force operations. Yellow refers to the sun and the excellence required of Air Force personnel. The gauntlet and winged sword symbolize the air striking power and strength of the Squadron, which provides the knowledge and training for the forces, represented by the lightning flashes.)

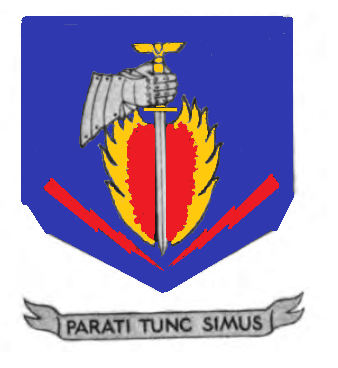
- 340th Bombardment Squadron emblem (Note: Approved 16 March 1956. Description: On an Air Force blue shield, an armored hand proper, hilt and pommel Air Force yellow, through a stylized bolt of fire, center red, flames of the third [color mentioned], all between two red lightning flashes radiating in base.)

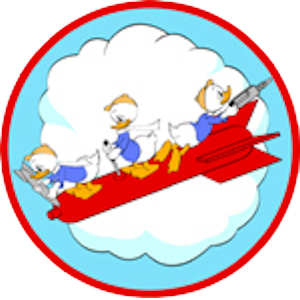
- 340th Bombardment Squadron emblem (World War II)
- Tail Code: BD

The 340th Weapons Squadron is a United States Air Force unit assigned to the USAF Weapons School at Nellis Air Force Base, Nevada. It is stationed at Barksdale Air Force Base, Louisiana. The mission of the squadron is to provide Boeing B-52 Stratofortress instructional flying.

The squadron was activated during World War II as the 340th Bombardment Squadron. a Boeing B-17 Flying Fortress squadron, assigned to the 97th Bombardment Group. After brief training in the United States, it was one of the first heavy bomber squadrons to deploy to the European Theater of Operations. At the end of the year, following Operation Torch, the invasion of North Africa, it participated in the strategic bombing campaign against Germany from the Mediterranean Theater of Operations. It earned two Distinguished Unit Citations for its actions. Following V-E Day, it was inactivated in Italy.

The squadron was again activated as an element of Strategic Air Command in 1946. It flew a series of Boeing bombers in the strategic deterrent role until inactivating. During the Vietnam War, B-52 crews from the squadron participated in the Linebacker offensives over the skies of North Vietnam. In August 1990 the 340th deployed aircrews for Operation Desert Storm.

== History ==
=== World War II ===
==== Organization and training ====
The squadron was activated at MacDill Field, Florida in February 1942 as the 340th Bombardment Squadron, one of the original squadrons of the 97th Bombardment Group. The following month, it moved to Sarasota Army Air Field, Florida, where it trained with Boeing B-17 Flying Fortress aircraft and also flew antisubmarine patrols. After a brief training period the squadron left Sarasota on 16 May.

The ground echelon sailed on the RMS Queen Elizabeth, arriving in Scotland on 10 June and at RAF Polebrook two days later. The air echelon, along with the air echelon of the 341st Bombardment Squadron staged through Dow Field, Maine starting on 15 May. From 2 through 11 June the squadrons deployed elements to the Pacific Coast, recommencing their deployment to Great Britain via Goose Bay Airport, Labrador and Greenland to Prestwick Airport Scotland on 23 June. The squadron's B-17s began arriving at Polebrook on 1 July, where they formed part of the first heavy bomber group assigned to Eighth Air Force.

==== Combat in Europe ====
===== Operations from Great Britain =====
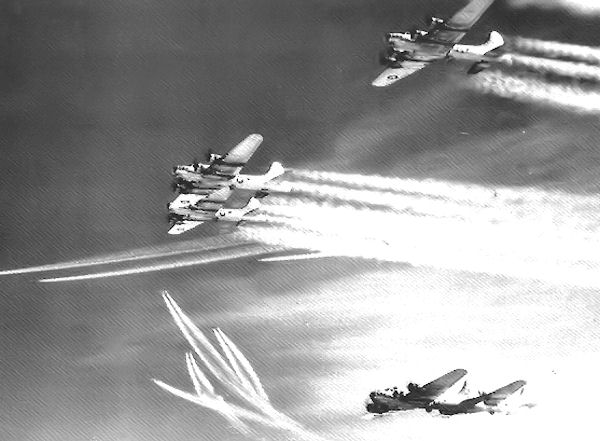
B-17Gs from the 340th Squadron wing their way towards Linz, Austria, with their P-38 Lightning escorts' contrails above them.

The haste with which the squadron had trained and deployed resulted in deficiencies in its training. Most pilots had not flown at high altitudes on oxygen; some gunners had never operated a turret, much less fired at a moving target. Crews had flown together for only a few weeks in training. The squadron's first weeks in England were devoted to intensive training, with numerous specialists attending Royal Air Force (RAF) schools to prepare for combat. The squadron flew its first mission on 17 August 1942, attacking a marshalling yard at Sotteville-lès-Rouen, the largest and most active marshalling yard in northern France. This was the first mission flown by AAF heavy bombers stationed in Great Britain, and was led by the squadron's commander, Major Paul W. Tibbets. Two days later, the squadron supported Operation Jubilee, the raid on Dieppe, by attacking Abbeville/Drucat Airfield. It attacked naval installations, airfields and industrial and transportation targets in France and the Low Countries.

In September, the 97th Group and its squadrons were transferred to XII Bomber Command in the preparations for Operation Torch, the invasion of North Africa. However, VIII Bomber Command retained operational control of these units until they left England. The first AAF bomber groups to deploy to England had patterned their basing on that of the RAF Bomber Command, which typically had a wing with two bomber squadrons on a station. The 97th Group's 342nd and 414th Squadrons were at RAF Grafton Underwood, while 97th Group headquarters, the 340th and the 341st Squadrons were at Polebrook. In September, the AAF decided to follow its own organization and use larger bases that would accommodate an entire group, and the 414th and 342nd Squadrons joined the rest of the group at Polebrook.

===== Operations in the Mediterranean Theater =====
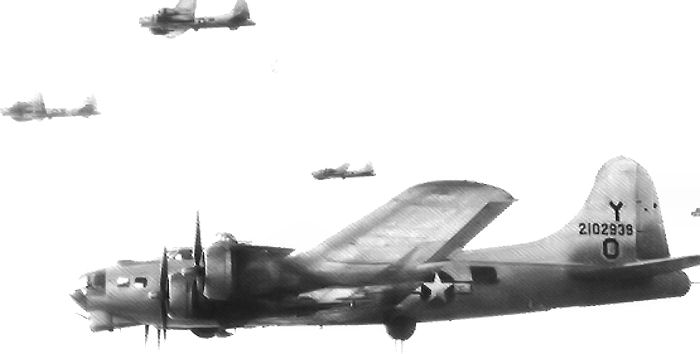
Squadron B-17Gs head north for Austria in the late summer of 1944. (Note: The aircraft closest to the camera, Boeing B-17G-60-BO Flying Fortress, serial 42-102938, Mouse (later Elaine P) was lost in a collision with B-17G 44-8406 while landing at Amendola on 2 January 1945. Baugher, Joe (19 January 2023). "1942 USAF Serial Numbers". Joe Baugher.)

Following the Operation Torch landings at Oran and Algiers on 8 November, the air echelon of the 340th left Polebrook on 18 November, staging through RAF Hurn for Maison Blanche Airport, Algeria. The ground echelon sailed by convoy to Algeria. The squadron was established at Tafaraoui Airfield, Algeria near the end of November.

Through May 1943, the squadron engaged in the campaign to cut German supply lines in North Africa by striking shipping in the Mediterranean Sea and bombing docks, harbors, airfields and marshalling yards in North Africa, Sardinia, Sicily and southern France and Italy. The squadron moved forward through Algeria and into Tunisia during these operations. In June 1943, it supported Operation Corkscrew, the projected invasion of Pantelleria, which resulted in the surrender of the island without invasion. Through the summer of 1943, it supported Operation Husky, the invasion of Sicily, and Operation Avalanche, the invasion of Italy.

From November 1943, the squadron was primarily involved with the strategic bombing campaign against Germany. The following month, it moved to Italy, pausing at Cerignola Airfield for a month before moving to Amendola Airfield, which would be its station for the remainder of the war. It bombed targets in Austria, Bulgaria, Czechoslovakia, Germany, Greece, Hungary, Romania, and Yugoslavia; striking strategic targets such as oil refineries, aircraft factories and marshalling yards. During Big Week, the intensive attacks on the German aircraft industry in February 1944, it was part of the lead formation on a strike on an aircraft manufacturing plant at Steyr, Austria, for which it was awarded its first Distinguished Unit Citation (DUC). It received a second DUC for an attack on the oil refineries near Ploesti, Romania on 18 August 1944.

The group also flew air support and interdiction missions against enemy lines of communication, airfields and transportation facilities. It supported Allied forces at Anzio and Monte Cassino. It supported Operation Dragoon, the invasion of southern France, with attacks on coastal defenses. In the spring of 1945, it supported United States Fifth Army and British Eighth Army in their advance through the Po Valley.

Following V-E Day, the squadron moved to Marcianise Airfield, Italy, where it was inactivated on 29 October 1945.

=== Cold War ===
==== Superfortress operations ====
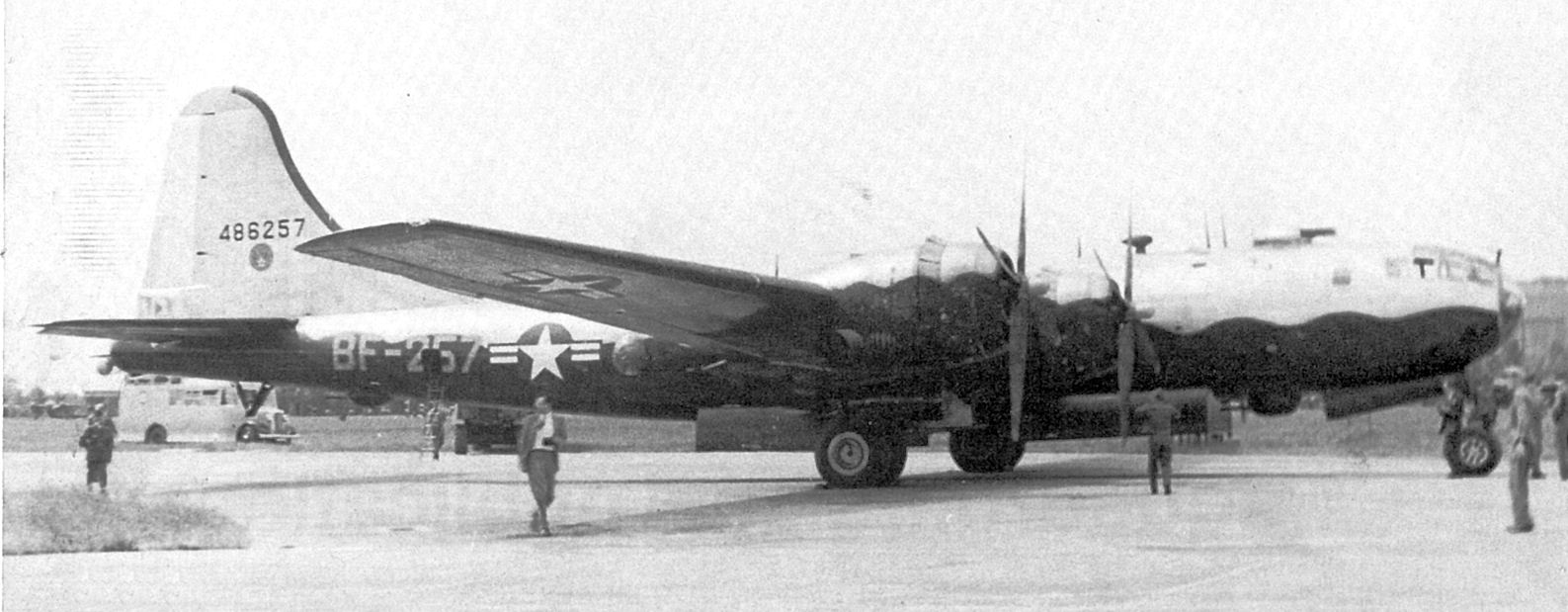
97th Wing B-29 deployed to England in 1950 (Note: Aircraft is Martin Aircraft built Boeing B-29-40-MO Superfortress, serial 44-86257.)

The squadron was reactivated at Smoky Hill Army Air Field, Kansas in August 1946, where it took over the personnel and Boeing B-29 Superfortresses of the 506th Bombardment Squadron, which was simultaneously inactivated. The squadron deployed to Eielson Air Force Base, Alaska in November 1947 and flew training missions over the Arctic Ocean until March 1948, when it returned to Kansas. Two months later, the squadron moved to Biggs Air Force Base, Texas. In November 1948, the squadron, along with its sister squadron, the 341st Bombardment Squadron, deployed to RAF Marham in a show of force during the Berlin Blockade, remaining there until February 1949. The squadron relieved the B-29s of the 307th Bombardment Group, which had deployed in July 1948. Although the Soviets did not know it at the time, the deployed B-29s did not have a nuclear capability. Only the B-29s of the 509th Bombardment Group were nuclear capable at the time.

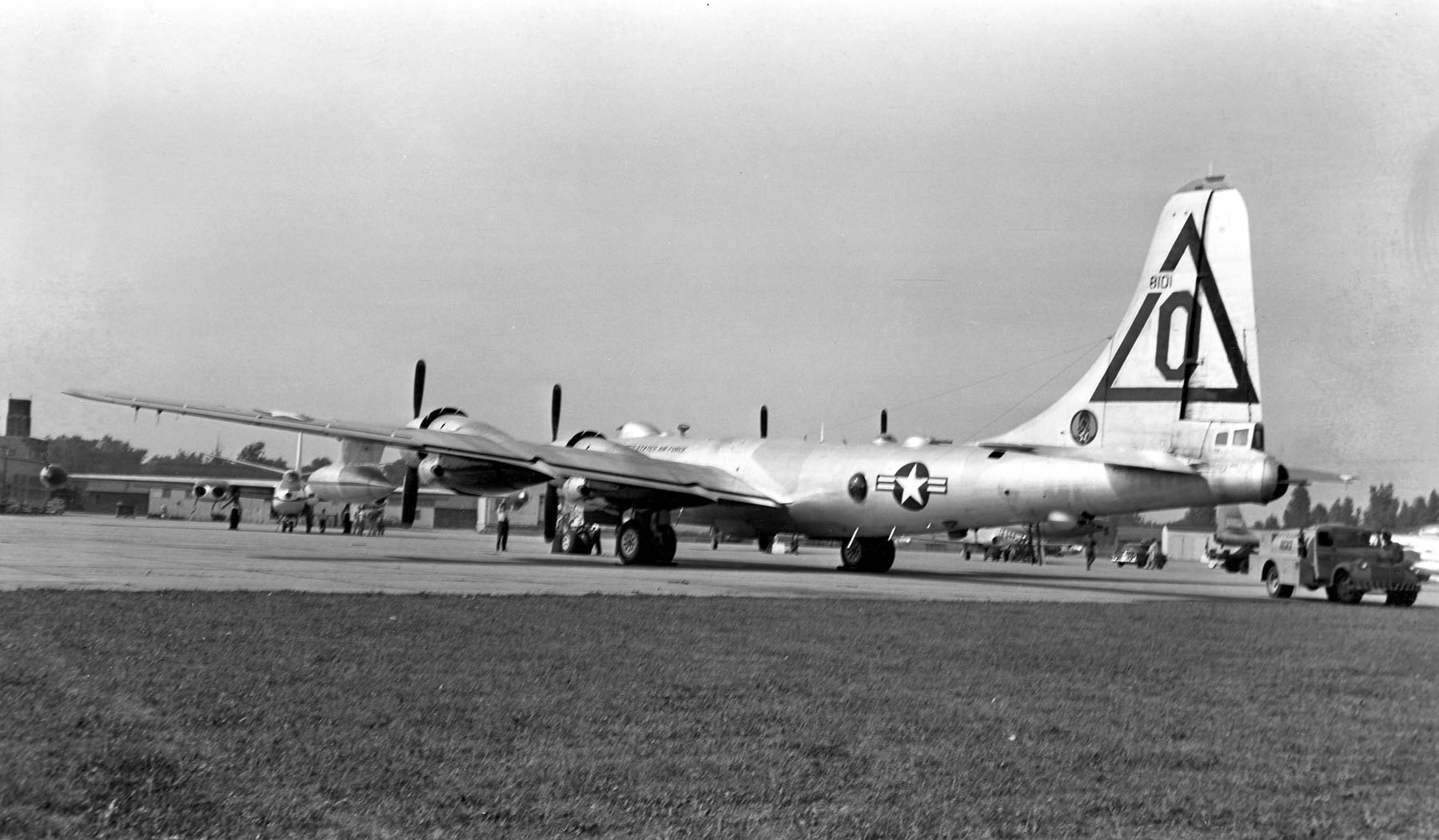
97th Wing B-50 at Biggs AFB (Note: Aircraft is Boeing B-50D-100-BO, serial 48-101.)

In 1950, the 340th upgraded to the improved Boeing B-50 Superfortress. It deployed along with all operational elements of the 97th Bombardment Wing to RAF Sculthorpe from July to October 1950 and to RAF Lakenheath from March to June 1952. From 1952 to 1954, squadrons of the 97th Wing kept deployed elements on Andersen Air Force Base, Guam. The squadron deployed there from December 1953 to March 1954.

Strategic Air Command (SAC)’s mobilization for the Korean War highlighted that SAC wing commanders focused too much on running the base organization and not spending enough time on overseeing actual combat preparations. To allow wing commanders the ability to focus on combat operations, the air base group commander became responsible for managing the base housekeeping functions. Under the plan implemented in February 1951 and finalized in June 1952, the wing commander focused primarily on the combat units and the maintenance necessary to support combat aircraft by having the combat and maintenance squadrons report directly to the wing and eliminating the intermediate group structures. With this reorganization, the squadron now reported directly to the 97th Bombardment Wing.

Upon returning to Texas, the squadron assumed an electronic warfare and reconnaissance mission, exchanging its B-50s for ERB-29A, RB-50G and RB-50E Superfortress in addition to Boeing KB-29 Superfortress tankers. Through April 1955, the squadron deployed aircraft and crews to Japan and England for these missions.

==== Stratojet operations ====
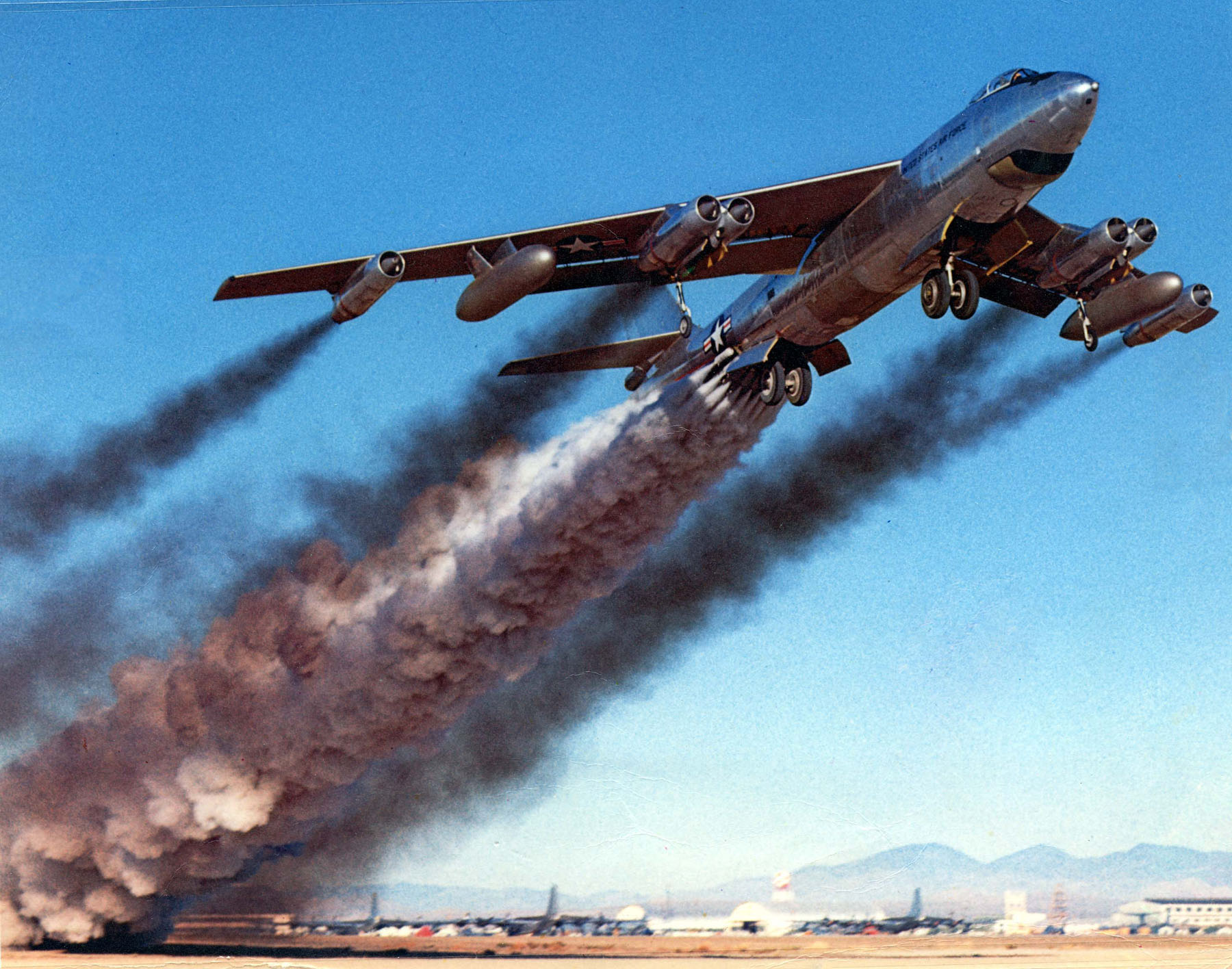
Rocket-assisted take-off of a Boeing B-47

In 1955, the squadron converted to the Boeing B-47 Stratojet jet bomber. It deployed to RAF Upper Heyford from May to July 1956 in what was to be the last deployment of the full 97th Wing, although the squadron deployed as a unit to Alaska in 1957.

Operation Reflex placed Stratojets and Boeing KC-97s at bases closer to the Soviet Union for 90 day periods, although individuals rotated back to home bases during unit Reflex deployments The percentage of SAC planes on alert gradually grew over the next three years to reach its goal of 1/3 of SAC’s force on alert by 1960. A combination of the phasing out of B-47 and KC-97 aircraft and an unfavorable balance of payments problem led to the end of Reflex operations starting in 1963. All Reflex operations ended by 31 March 1965. Ground alert for the KC-97 terminated on 10 November 1965 and for B-47s on 11 February 1966.

The squadron phased down for inactivation in December 1958 and became nonoperational in January 1959. In July 1959 it moved to Blytheville Air Force Base, but remained nonoperational.

==== Stratofortresss operations ====
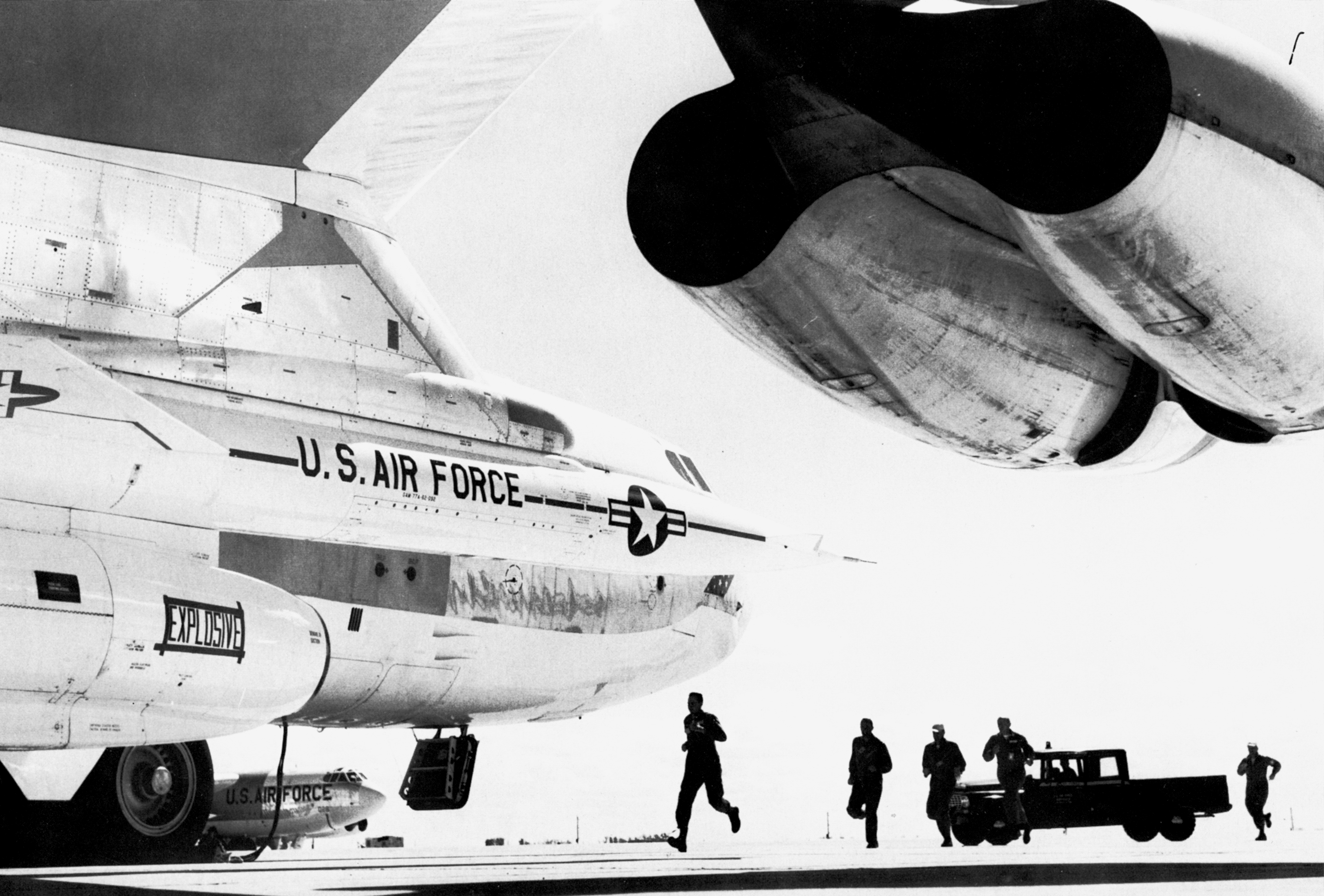
B-52G crew responding to an alert

At Blytheville, the 340th began to equip with Boeing B-52G Stratofortress strategic bombers in late 1959. (Note: Bailey dates equipping with B-52s to 1960.) By 1962, half The squadron's aircraft were placed on alert. SAC planners were looking into additional methods to protect their forces in addition to the ground alert program. In January 1961, SAC disclosed it was maintaining an airborne force for "airborne alert training" in Operation Chrome Dome. In January 1962, the squadron was one of the first five in SAC to carry GAM-72 Quail decoy missiles aboard its airborne alert aircraft

Soon after detection of Soviet missiles in Cuba in October 1962, SAC brought all its degraded and adjusted alert sorties up to full capability. On 20 October the squadron was directed to put two additional planes on alert. On 22 October, 1/8 of the squadron's B-52s were placed on airborne alert. On 24 October SAC went to DEFCON 2, placing all squadron aircraft on alert. As tensions eased, on 21 November SAC went to DEFCON 3 and returned to its normal airborne alert posture. On 27 November the squadron returned to its normal ground alert posture. The squadron's actions during the Cuban Missile Crisis earned it an Air Force Outstanding Unit Award.

The squadron supported SAC combat operations in Southeast Asia from the mid late 1960s through the early 1970s by providing aircraft and crews to other SAC units. From mid 1972 to October 1973, all the squadron's aircraft and a large part of its personnel were on duty in Southeast Asia, the Far East, and other locations. As the demand for squadron aircraft and crews for the Vietnam War increased, the number of aircraft on alert decreased to 40 per cent (Note: This alert status was not uniform through the command. Units committed to Operation Arc Light had no alert bombers, while undeployed squadrons maintained normal alert status. Which category a specific squadron fell into varied over time.) Even when planes were available for alert, on occasion crews had rotated to the combat zone and the planes could not be manned. On 15 August 1973, squadron crew E-21 flew the last B-52 mission over a target in Cambodia, marking the end of the United States' strategic bombing in Southeast Asia.

During the 1973 Yom Kippur War, The US was concerned that the war would expand, and once again SAC increased its alert posture. This lasted only two days. In 1979, during Exercise Global Shield 79, SAC exercised every phase of its role in the SIOP short of actual warfare. Hundreds of bombers, tankers, and missiles were brought up to alert status. Aircraft and supporting personnel were dispersed to preselected bases and flew simulated nuclear missions from them. The ground alert program was ended on 17 September 1991. The squadron deployed personnel and equipment to Diego Garcia from 1990 to 1991.

The squadron deployed aircraft and crews to the 806th Bombardment Wing (Provisional) at RAF Fairford, England in January and February 1991, from which they engaged in combat operations during Operation Desert Storm. As SAC reduced its forces after the end of the Cold War, the squadron was inactivated in February 1992.

=== Bomber training ===
On 1 October 1989, the B-52 Division of the Strategic Weapons School was activated, graduating its first class in April 1990. When SAC was disestablished in 1992 and replaced by Air Combat Command, the division became Detachment 2, USAF Weapons School. In February 2003, the detachment was replaced at Barksdale Air Force Base, Louisiana by the squadron, now designated the 340th Weapons Squadron. B-52 training was changed to restore training on nuclear weapons in 2006 following an incident in which six nuclear weapons were accidentally flown from Minot Air Force Base, North Dakota aboard a B-52.

In 2023, with a large number of modifications programmed to extend the service life of the B-52, the squadron combined with the 49th Test and Evaluation Squadron to form an integrated team focused on testing and developing tactics for B-52 Stratofortress systems before they are fielded. The integrated squadrons participated in Exercise Northern Edge 23, where they gained insights into B-52 data link modifications with Agile Pod and Link-16, which allowed the team to provide inputs to create familiarization for the new hardware into courseware for weapons school classes.

== Lineage ==
- Constituted as the 340th Bombardment Squadron (Heavy) on 28 January 1942

Activated on 3 February 1942
Redesignated 340th Bombardment Squadron, Heavy on 6 March 1944
Inactivated on 29 October 1945
Redesignated 340th Bombardment Squadron, Very Heavy on 15 July 1946
Activated on 4 August 1946
Redesignated 340th Bombardment Squadron, Medium on 28 May 1948
Redesignated 340th Bombardment Squadron, Heavy on 1 October 1959
Redesignated 340th Bomb Squadron on 1 September 1991
Inactivated on 7 January 1992
Redesignated 340th Weapons Squadron on 24 January 2003
Activated on 3 February 2003

=== Assignments ===
- 97th Bombardment Group, 3 February 1942 – 29 October 1945
- 97th Bombardment Group, 4 August 1946 (attached to 7th Bombardment Wing after 10 February 1951)
- 97th Bombardment Wing, 16 June 1952
- 97th Operations Group, 1 September 1991 – 7 January 1992
- USAF Weapons School, 3 February 2003 – present

=== Stations ===
- MacDill Field, Florida, 3 February 1942
- Sarasota Army Air Field, Florida, 29 March–16 May 1942
- RAF Polebrook (AAF-110), England, 11 June–10 November 1942
- Maison Blanche Airport, Algiers, Algeria, c. 13 November 1942
- Tafaraoui Airfield, Algeria, c. 22 November 1942
- Biskra Airfield, Algeria, 26 December 1942
- Chateau-dun-du-Rhumel Airfield, Algeria, 8 February 1943
- Pont du Fahs Airfield, Tunisia, 12 August 1943
- Depienne Airfield, Tunisia, 14 August 1943
- Cerignola Airfield, Italy, c. 14 December 1943
- Amendola Airfield, Italy, 17 January 1944
- Marcianise Airfield, Italy, c. October–29 October 1945
- Smoky Hill Army Air Field, Kansas, 4 August 1946 (deployed to Mile 26 Airfield (later, Eielson Air Force Base), Alaska), 4 November 1947 – 12 March 1948
- Biggs Air Force Base, Texas, 17 May 1948 (deployed to RAF Lakenheath, England, 5 March–4 June 1952; Andersen Air Force Base, Guam, 16 December 1953 – c. 15 Mar 1954; RAF Upper Heyford, England, 5 May–4 July 1956; Eielson Air Force Base, Alaska, 24 September – 2 November 1957) (Detachments at RAF Lakenheath, England, and Yokota Air Base, Japan, April 1954 – 1 April 1955)
- Blytheville Air Force Base (later Eaker Air Force Base), Arkansas, 1 July 1959 – 7 January 1992
- Barksdale Air Force Base, Louisiana, 3 February 2003 – present

=== Aircraft ===
- Boeing B-17 Flying Fortress, 1942–1945
- Boeing B-29 Superfortress, 1946–1950
- Boeing B-50 Superfortress, 1950–1954
- Boeing KB-29 Superfortress, 1954–1955
- Boeing ERB-29 Superfortress, 1954–1955
- Boeing RB-50 Superfortress, 1954–1955
- Boeing B-47 Stratojet, 1955–1959
- Boeing B-52 Stratofortress, 1960–1991

=== Awards and campaigns ===
Award streamer	Award	Dates	Notes
	Distinguished Unit Citation	24 February 1944	340th Bombardment Squadron Steyr, Austria
	Distinguished Unit Citation	18 August 1944	340th Bombardment Squadron Ploesti, Romania
	Air Force Outstanding Unit Award	[April 1954-1 April 1955]	340th Bombardment Squadron
	Air Force Outstanding Unit Award	2 July-3 November 1957	340th Bombardment Squadron
	Air Force Outstanding Unit Award	23 October-22 November 1962	340th Bombardment Squadron
	Air Force Outstanding Unit Award	1 July 1975-30 June 1977	340th Bombardment Squadron
	Air Force Outstanding Unit Award	1 July 1977-30 June 1978	340th Bombardment Squadron
	Air Force Outstanding Unit Award	1 July 1978-30 June 1980	340th Bombardment Squadron
	Air Force Outstanding Unit Award	1 July 1986-30 June 1988	340th Bombardment Squadron
	Air Force Outstanding Unit Award	1 June 2004-31 May 2006	340th Weapons Squadron
	Air Force Outstanding Unit Award	1 June 2013-31 May 2015	340th Weapons Squadron
	Air Force Outstanding Unit Award	1 June 2019-31 May 2020	340th Weapons Squadron
	Air Force Outstanding Unit Award	1 June 2020-31 May 2021	340th Weapons Squadron
	Air Force Outstanding Unit Award	1 June 2022-31 May 2024	340th Weapons Squadron

Campaign Streamer	Campaign	Dates	Notes
	Antisubmarine	29 March 1942–16 May 1942	340th Bombardment Squadron
	Air Combat, EAME Theater	11 June 1942–11 May 1945	340th Bombardment Squadron
	Air Offensive, Europe	4 July 1942–5 June 1944	340th Bombardment Squadron
	Egypt-Libya	13 November 1942–12 February 1943	340th Bombardment Squadron
	Naples-Foggia	18 August 1943–21 January 1944	340th Bombardment Squadron
	Anzio	22 January 1944–24 May 1944	340th Bombardment Squadron
	Rome-Arno	22 January 1944–9 September 1944	340th Bombardment Squadron
	Central Europe	22 March 1944–21 May 1945	340th Bombardment Squadron
	Normandy	6 June 1944–24 July 1944	340th Bombardment Squadron
	Northern France	25 July 1944–14 September 1944	340th Bombardment Squadron
	Southern France	15 August 1944–14 September 1944	340th Bombardment Squadron
	North Apennines	10 September 1944–4 April 1945	340th Bombardment Squadron
	Rhineland	15 September 1944–21 March 1945	340th Bombardment Squadron
	Po Valley	3 April 1945–8 May 1945	340th Bombardment Squadron
	Defense of Saudi Arabia	2 August 1990–16 January 1991	340th Bombardment Squadron
	Liberation and Defense of Kuwait	17 January 1991–11 April 1991	340th Bombardment Squadron

== See also ==
- List of United States Air Force weapons squadrons
- Boeing B-17 Flying Fortress Units of the Mediterranean Theater of Operations
- List of B-29 Superfortress operators
- List of B-50 units of the United States Air Force
- List of B-47 units of the United States Air Force
- List of B-52 Units of the United States Air Force
