= Weapons Director Badge =

United States Air Force military badge

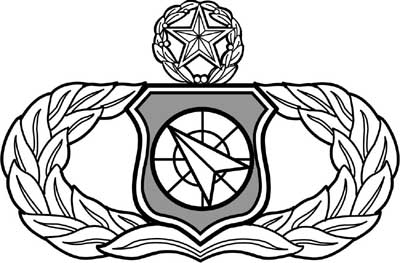
Master Weapons Director Badge

The Weapons Director Badge is a military badge of the United States Air Force which is issued to personnel who are qualified in command and control and have been specially trained as flight controllers in air battle management.

The standard Weapons Director Badge is issued upon completion of basic weapons director or air battle manager command and control training. Upgrades to Senior Weapons Director and Master Weapons Director occur based on experience and years of service in the Air Force. According to AFI 36-2903 (2011), "The Weapons Director basic occupational badge criteria for 1C5X1D is awarded upon completion of the Basic Weapons Director course. For award of the senior badge (7-skill level), Airman must meet requirements for the award of the basic badge and have a minimum of 5 total years qualified Weapons Director experience. For award of the master badge, Airman must meet requirements for award of the senior badge, hold the rank of MSgt or above and have a minimum of 7 total years of Weapons Director experience" (p. 137). The Senior Weapons Director Badge is annotated by a star above the badge and the Master Badge displays a star and wreath.

Most personnel, who receive the Weapons Director Badge, are assigned to Ground Theater Air Control Systems (GTACS) such as the Air Force Control and Reporting Center (CRC). Officers who are not eligible for the Air Battle Manager Badge may be eligible to receive the Weapons Director Badge. Advanced training for 1C5X1D Weapons Directors is available at the 8th Weapons Squadron, Nellis AFB, Nevada. This challenging school is available to select 1C5X1D personnel in the rank of Senior Airmen through Technical Sergeant and is one of the most challenging advanced enlisted skills courses in the US Air Force.

The badge was first authorized in mid 1969 for Officers in the 17XX career field, Weapons Control, and was seen as a motivational tool to raise morale in a career field that was noted for its remote assignments, family separations, and difficult living conditions. The regulatory cite is AFR 900-21.
