= 325th Weapons Squadron =

325th Weapons Squadron

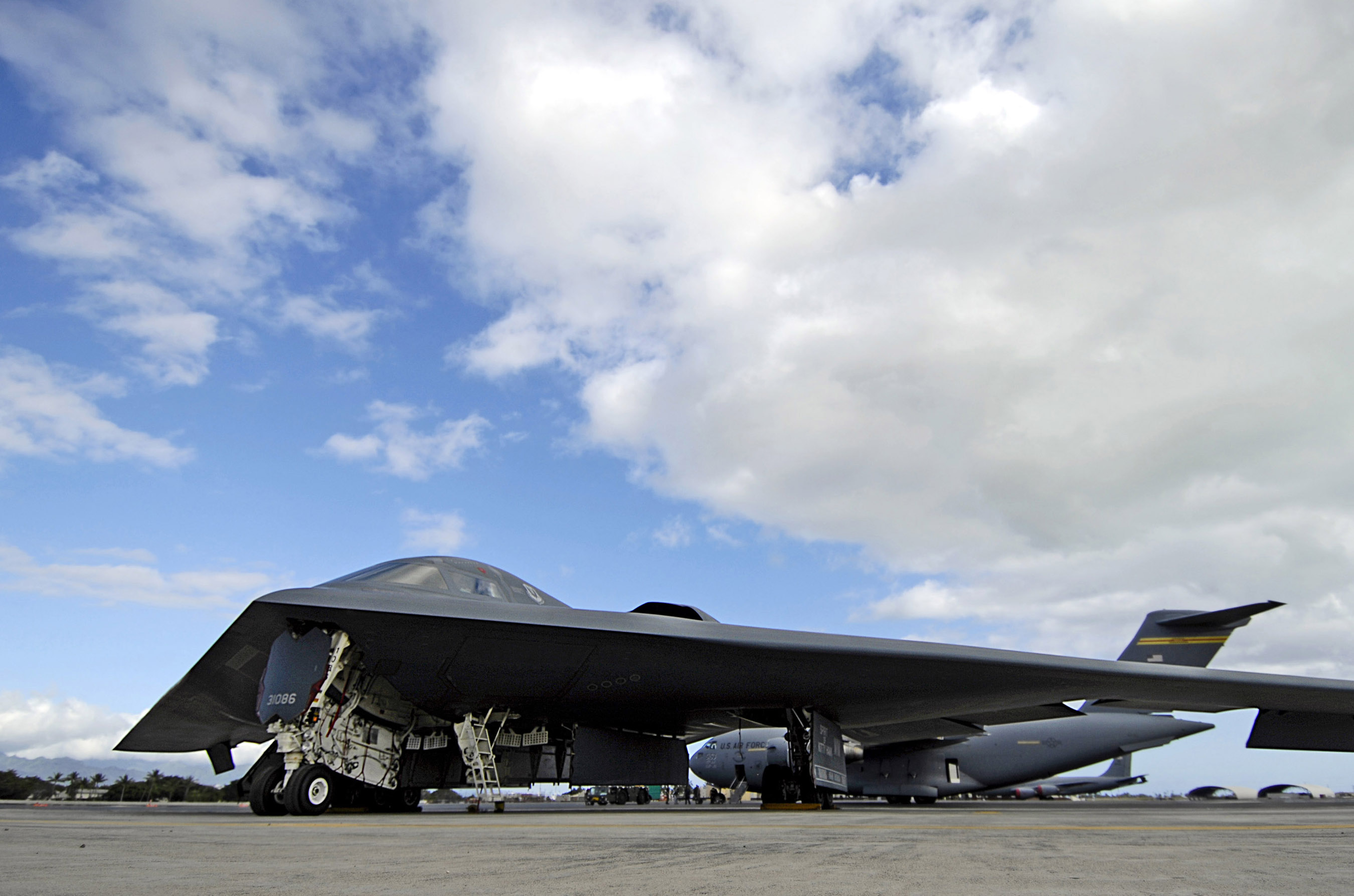
- B-2 Spirit
- Active: 1942–1946; 1946–1994; 1998–present
- Country: United States
- Branch: United States Air Force
- Type: Squadron
- Role: Advanced B-2 Spirit Training
- Part of: Air Combat Command
- Garrison/HQ: Whiteman Air Force Base, Missouri
- Engagements: European Theater of Operations; Korean War
- Decorations: Distinguished Unit Citation Air Force Outstanding Unit Award with Combat "V" Device Air Force Outstanding Unit Award Republic of Korea Presidential Unit Citation Vietnamese Gallantry Cross with Palm

Insignia
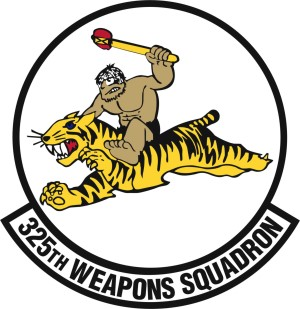
- 325th Weapons Squadron emblem (Note: Approved 3 June 1943. Description: Over and through a white disc, thin border black, the comic strip character "Alley Oop" proper, riding on the back of a leaping saber tooth tiger proper, and holding aloft a stone club in sinister hand in striking position.)
- World War II fuseage code: NV

The 325th Weapons Squadron is a United States Air Force unit assigned to the USAF Weapons School, stationed at Whiteman Air Force Base, Missouri, it is a geographically separated unit of the USAF Weapons School at Nellis Air Force Base, Nevada. The mission of the squadron is to provide Northrop Grumman B-2 Spirit instructional flying.

The squadron was first activated as the 325th Bombardment Squadron in March 1942. After participating in the antisubmarine campaign while training, it moved to the United Kingdom in August 1942, where it became a training unit for heavy bombers. From May 1943, it participated in the strategic bombing campaign against Germany. It earned two Distinguished Unit Citations for its actions. After V-E Day, it moved to France, performing airlift missions until it was inactivated in February 1946.

The squadron was activated at Fort Worth Army Air Field, Texas the following August as a Strategic Air Command long range bomber unit. It continued this role until inactivating in 1994. The squadron deployed to Japan in 1950, flying missions during the Korean War. During the Vietnam War, it deployed aircrew and aircraft to participate in Operation Arc Light and Operation Linebacker. It was activated again in 1998. It participated in Operation Allied Force, Enduring Freedom and Iraqi Freedom. In 2005, it converted from a bombing to a training mission.

== Mission ==
The squadron mission is to build the Air Force’s future weapons officers by teaching them how to instruct others in the B-2 Spirit community and lead the combat Air Force as warfighting experts.

== History ==
=== World War II ===
==== Initial organization and training ====
The squadron was activated at Barksdale Field, Louisiana on 1 March 1942, as the 325th Bombardment Squadron, one of the four original squadrons of the 92nd Bombardment Group. Later that month it moved to MacDill Field, Florida and trained with Boeing B-17 Flying Fortresses. While training in Florida, the squadron also flew antisubmarine patrols off the Florida coast. The squadron's air echelon departed Sarasota Army Air Field for Westover Field, Massachusetts on 19 June 1942, flying on to Dow Field, Maine on 29 June. The squadron then ferried their B-17s across the North Atlantic via Newfoundland starting between 12 and 15 August. They flew directly from Newfoundland to Prestwick Airport, Scotland. The 92nd Group was the first to fly their bombers non-stop across the Atlantic. (Note: The 97th Bombardment Group had flown its planes across the Atlantic with stops in Greenland and Iceland. Freeman, pp. 6-7.) Meanwhile, the ground echelon left Bradenton on 18 July, arriving at Fort Dix, New Jersey in the New York Port of Embarkation two days later. It sailed aboard the USS West Point (AP-23) on 2 August and docked at Liverpool on 18 August, moving to Bovingdon the same day.

==== Operations in the European Theater ====
The buildup of Eighth Air Force in England required the establishment of a combat crew replacement and training center, but a lack of qualified personnel and aircraft hampered its development. As a result, the decision was made to use the 92nd Group and its squadrons as a temporary crew training unit, acting as the main component of what became the 11th Combat Crew Replacement Center Group. However, the 92nd was the first group to arrive in England with improved B-17Fs, and with the training mission came an exchange of these newer models for the older B-17Es of the 97th Bombardment Group to use in training. On 6 September, to provide the squadron with combat experience, it flew its first combat mission against the Potez aircraft factory at Meaulte, France. Although remaining a replacement crew training unit until May 1943, the squadron initially flew occasional combat missions. In January 1943, the squadron moved to RAF Alconbury.

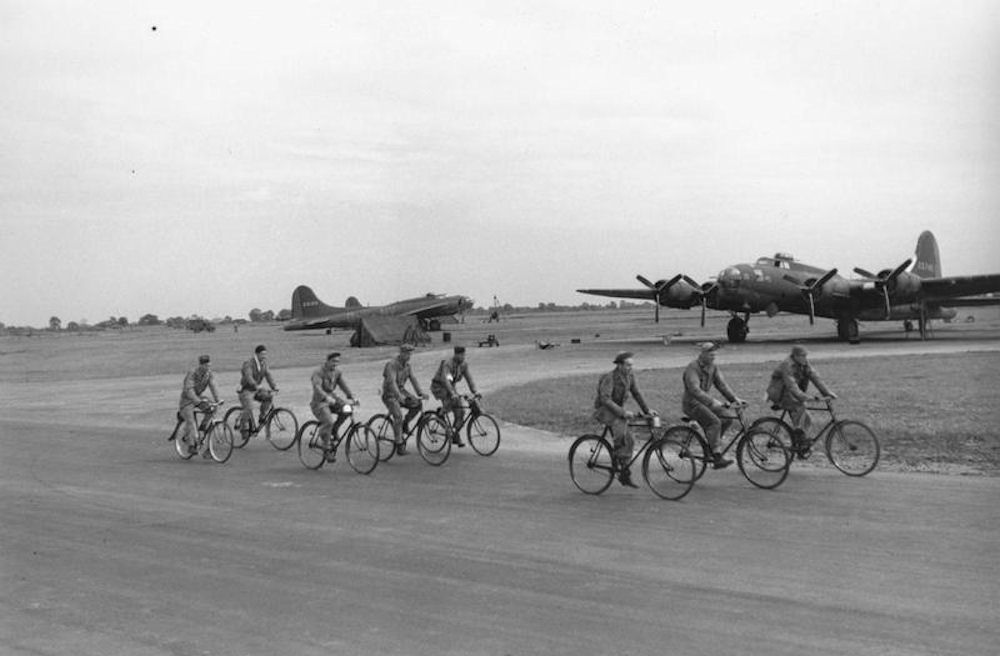
B-17s of the 92nd Bombardment Group at RAF Alconbury

In May 1943, the squadron's training mission was transferred and the 325th began flying combat missions. Through May 1944 its targets included shipyards at Kiel, ball bearing plants at Schweinfurt, submarine pens at Wilhelmshaven, a tire manufacturing plant at Hannover, airfields near Paris, an aircraft factory at Nantes and a magnesium mine in Norway.

During the summer of 1943, the squadron began experimenting with H2S, a radar bombing system developed by the Royal Air Force. In August 1943, VIII Bomber Command established a new unit, the 482d Bombardment Group at Alconbury that was dedicated to the pathfinder mission. The squadron transferred its trained personnel and H2S-equipped B-17Fs to the 482d's 813th Bombardment Squadron.

The squadron earned a Distinguished Unit Citation on 11 January 1944, when it successfully bombed aircraft manufacturing factories in Oschersleben, Germany despite adverse weather, a lack of fighter protection and heavy flak. It participated in Big Week, the intensive attack against German aircraft industry in late February 1944. It took part in Operation Crossbow, attacks on launch sites for V-1 flying bombs and V-2 rockets. It struck airfields and industrial sites in France, Belgium, the Netherlands, and Germany. After October 1944 it concentrated on transportation and oil industry targets. On 11 September, it earned a second DUC for a mission against petroleum facilities at Merseburg.

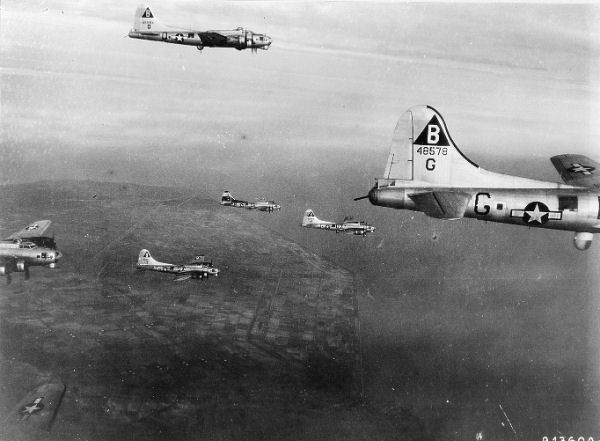
92nd Group B-17s on the way to a target in Europe

In addition to its strategic bombing mission, the squadron flew interdiction and air support missions. During Operation Overlord, the Normandy invasion, it attacked coastal defenses, transportation junctions and marshalling yards near the beachhead. It provided air support for Operation Cobra, the Allied breakout at Saint Lo, It bombed bridges and gun positions to support Operation Market Garden, the airborne attacks in the Netherlands near Arnhem, to secure bridgeheads across the Rhine in September. During the Battle of the Bulge, from December 1944 to January 1945, it attacked bridges and marshalling yards near the target area. During Operation Varsity, the airborne assault across the Rhine, it provided cover by bombing airfields near the drop zone. It flew its last combat mission on 25 April 1945, when the 92nd Group led the entire Eighth Air Force formation in an attack on Plzeň.

Following V-E Day, the squadron moved to Istres Air Base, France, where it participated in the Green Project, transporting troops returning to the United States, flying them to Cazes Field in Morocco until September, returning French servicemen to France on return trips. During the winter it flew displaced Greek nationals from Munich to Athens. It was inactivated in France on 28 February 1946 and its remaining personnel were absorbed into elements of the 306th Bombardment Group at Lechfeld Air Base, Germany.

=== Strategic Air Command ===
==== B-29 Superfortress operations ====
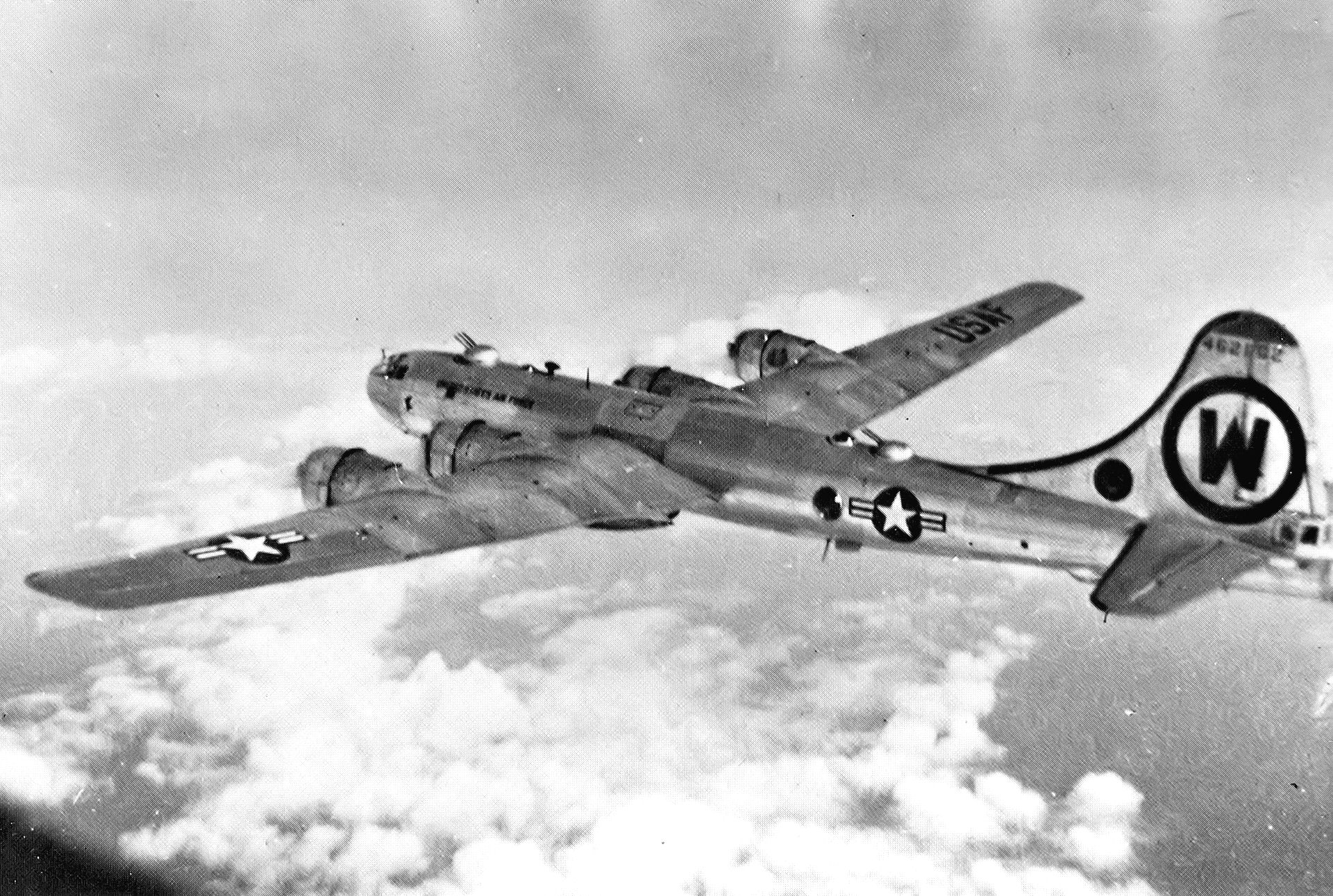
92d Bombardment Group B-29 Superfortress (Note: Aircraft is Boeing B-29A-60-BN Superfortress, serial 44-62102, Wright's Delight. The plane was transferred to the 98th Bombardment Group and crashed in North Korea on 19 November 1952. Dirkx, Marco (21 June 2024). "1944 USAF Serial Numbers". Joe Baugher’s Serial Number List.)

The squadron was soon reactivated at Fort Worth Army Air Field, Texas as a Strategic Air Command (SAC) squadron in August 1946, when it absorbed the personnel and Boeing B-29 Superfortresses of the 712th Bombardment Squadron, which was simultaneously inactivated. In October, the squadron moved to Smoky Hill Army Air Field, Kansas, but its stay there was short, as it moved to Spokane Army Air Field, which would be its home station for almost fifty years in June 1947. It trained for strategic bombardment missions at all three locations. The squadron deployed to RAF Sculthorpe with other combat elements of the 92nd Group between April and February 1949. This deployment of B-29s, which were known to be capable of carrying nuclear weapons, was part of a show of force to support the Berlin Airlift. In reality, the squadron's B-29s had not been modified to be armed with nuclear weapons.

In July 1950, the squadron deployed to Yokota Air Base, Japan, where it came under the control of Far East Air Forces Bomber Command (Provisional). The squadron bombed factories, refineries, iron works, hydroelectric plants, airfields, bridges, tunnels, troop concentrations, barracks, marshalling yards, road junctions, rail lines, supply dumps, docks, vehicles and other strategic and interdiction targets. It returned to Fairchild Air Force Base in late October 1950.

==== B-36 Peacemaker operations ====
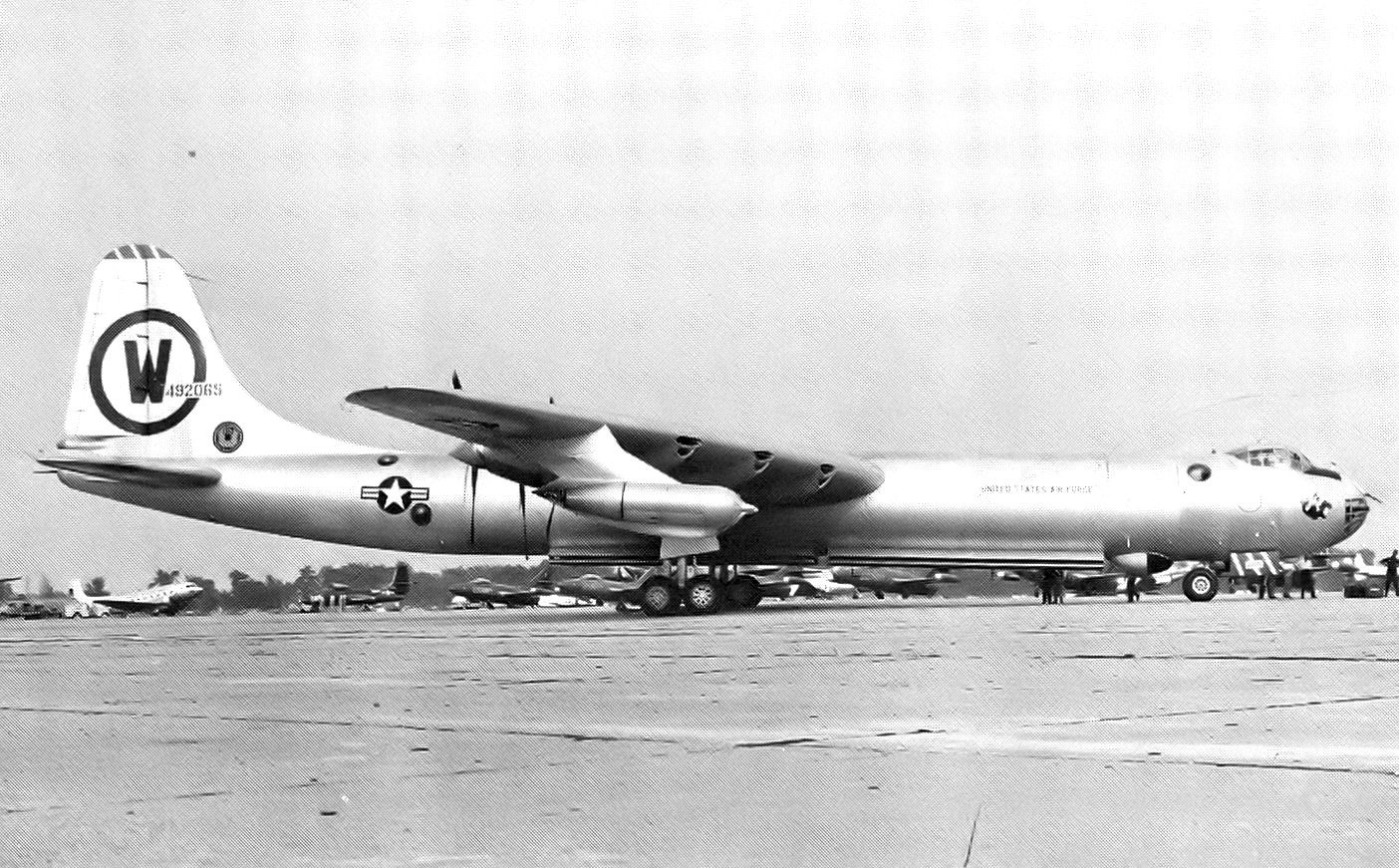
92d Bombardment Wing B-36 Peacemaker (Note: Aircraft is Consolidated B-36D-45-CF Peacemaker, serial 44-92065. Built as a B-36B-15-CF, later converted to B-36D by the addition of four jet engines. It was transferred to the Military Aircraft Storage and Disposition Center on 27 February 1957 and scrapped. Dirkx, Marco (18 August 2025). "1944 USAF Serial Numbers". Joe Baugher’s Serial Number List.)

In 1951, the squadron transitioned to the Convair B-36 Peacemaker intercontinental strategic bomber. The squadron participated in Operation Big Stick, a show of force in which the 92nd Wing deployed its B-36s to Japan. The squadron received the Air Force Outstanding Unit Award for its participation in this exercise. Along with other operational elements of the 92d Bombardment Wing, the squadron deployed to Andersen Air Force Base, Guam from 16 October 1954 to 12 January 1955 and again from 26 April to 5 July 1956. In the fall of 1956, the wing assumed an alert status due to tensions in the Middle East. It continued flying B-36s until 1957, when it began upgrading to Boeing B-52D Stratofortresses. (Note: This transition was nicknamed Operation Big Switch. A Legacy of Excellence, p. 14.)

==== B-52 Stratofortress operations ====
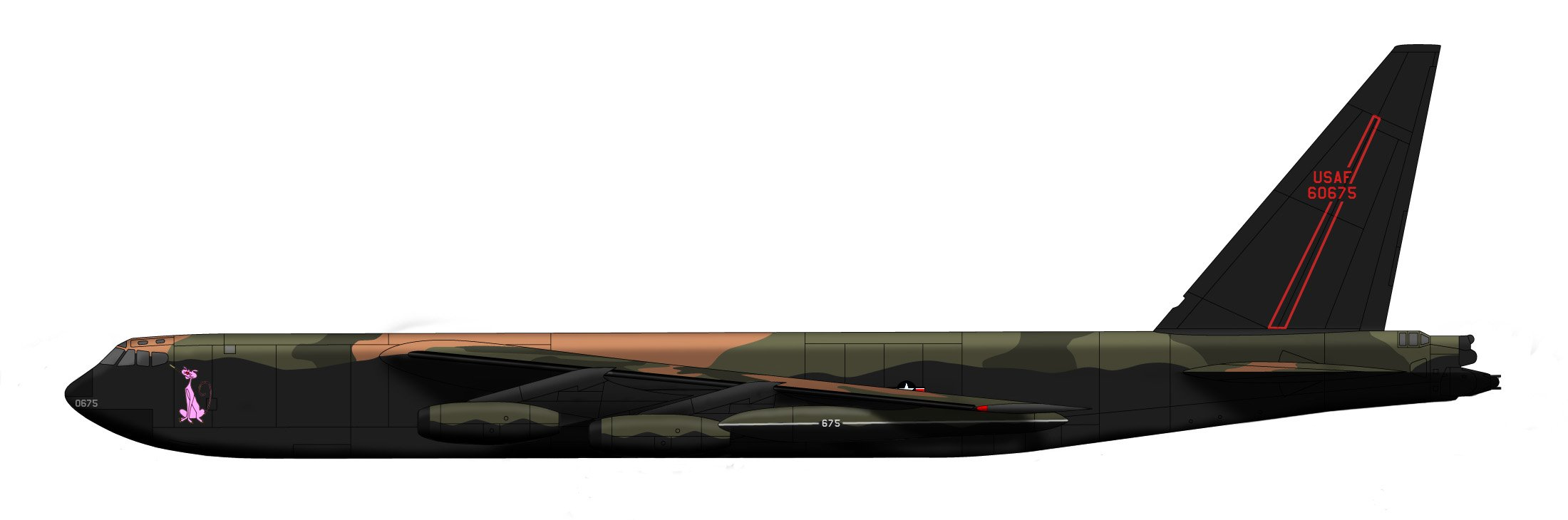
Squadron B52D in Vietnam era camouflage

Starting in 1960, one third of the squadron's aircraft were maintained on fifteen minute alert, fully fueled and ready for combat to reduce vulnerability to a Soviet missile strike. This was increased to half the squadron's aircraft in 1962. SAC planners were looking into methods to protect their forces in addition to the ground alert program as early as 1957. Tests under the name Operation Head Start were precursors to Operation Chrome Dome. From 2 March to 30 June 1959, the 92nd Wing participated in Operation Head Start II, keeping five of its armed bombers in the air for the entire period.. In January 1961, SAC disclosed it was maintaining an airborne force for "airborne alert training."

Soon after detection of Soviet missiles in Cuba, SAC brought all degraded and adjusted alert sorties up to full capability. On 20 October along with all B-52 units except those equipped with the B-52H, the squadron was directed to put two additional planes on alert. On 22 October, 1/8 of the squadron's B-52s were placed on airborne alert. Two days later, SAC went to DEFCON 2, placing all aircraft on alert. SAC returned to normal airborne alert posture on 21 November . On 27 November, SAC finally returned the squadron to its normal alert posture.

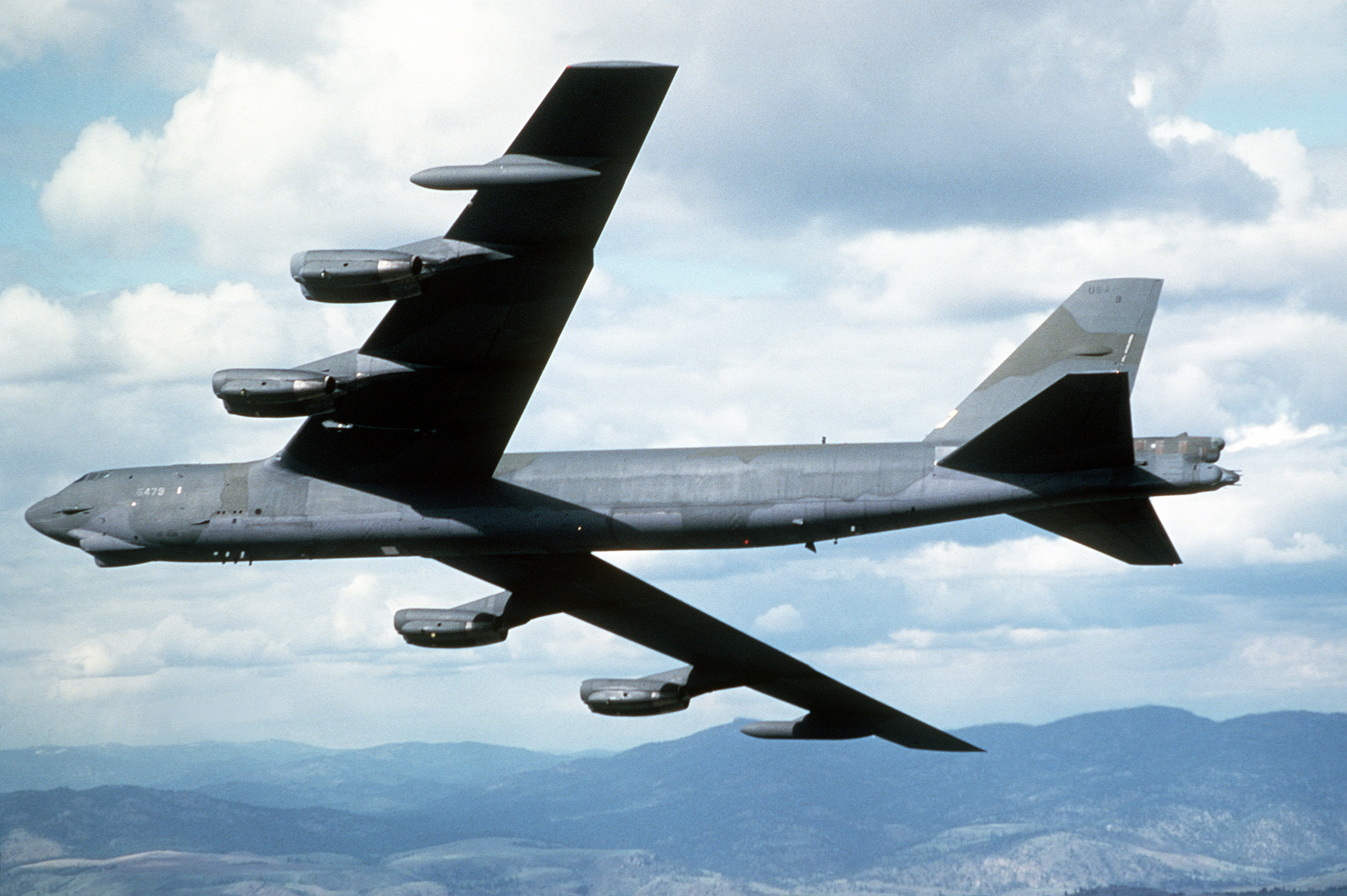
Squadron B-52G Stratofortress

Starting in 1965, the squadron deployed bombers and aircrew to Southeast Asia to support SAC operations. These deployments continued through 1975. During three periods, March to September 1968, March to September 1969, and June 1972 through October 1973, all the squadron's resources were deployed to support Operation Arc Light and Operation Linebacker. During periods it was undeployed, the squadron maintained normal alert status, although even when planes were available for alert, crews had rotated to the combat zone and not all tasked alert sorties could be manned.

On 28 September 1991, along with all SAC missile and bomber units, the squadron's B-52s were taken off alert. That same month, SAC implemented the Objective Wing organization, and the squadron was assigned to the reactivated 92nd Operations Group and redesignated the 325th Bomb Squadron. The following year, SAC was inactivated, and the squadron and most of the 92nd Wing transferred to Air Combat Command. On 1 July 1994, the squadron was inactivated as the 92nd Wing became an air refueling establishment, assigned to Air Mobility Command.

=== B-2 Spirit operations ===
The squadron was activated at Whiteman Air Force Base, Missouri as a Northrop Grumman B-2 Spirit bomb squadron in January 1998 and assigned to the 509th Operations Group. The squadron flew combat missions from Whiteman to Kosovo in Operation Allied Force from 24 March to 21 May 1999. It was the first B-2 unit to make a combat deployment when it deployed personnel and aircraft to participate in Operations Enduring Freedom and Iraqi Freedom in March 2003. Between 2001 and 2003, the squadron also flew missions from Whiteman and deployed elements to the Indian Ocean Area to perform combat operations in Afghanistan and Iraq in the Global War on Terror.

The squadron was taken off operational flying and was redesignated the 325th Weapons squadron and was reassigned to the USAF Weapons School, stationed at Nellis Air Force Base, Nevada, as a weapons training squadron in September 2005, assuming the assets of the 715th Weapons Squadron, which was simultaneously inactivated. The squadron qualifies weapons systems operators on the B-2 for the 509th Bomb Wing and the associate 131st Bomb Wing of the Missouri Air National Guard. Its instructor pilots include both active duty airmen and members of the Air National Guard.

== Lineage ==
- Constituted as the 325th Bombardment Squadron (Heavy) on 28 January 1942

Activated on 1 March 1942
Redesignated 325th Bombardment Squadron, Heavy on 29 September 1944
Inactivated on 28 February 1946

- Redesignated 325th Bombardment Squadron, Very Heavy on 15 July 1946

Activated on 4 August 1946
Redesignated 325th Bombardment Squadron, Medium on 28 May 1948
Redesignated 325th Bombardment Squadron, Heavy on 16 June 1951
Redesignated 325th Bomb Squadron on 1 September 1991
Inactivated on 1 July 1994

- Activated on 6 January 1998

Redesignated 325th Weapons Squadron on 9 September 2005

=== Assignments ===
- 92nd Bombardment Group, 1 March 1942 – 28 February 1946 (non-operational 20 August–15 September 1943)
- 92nd Bombardment Group, 4 August 1946 (attached to 92nd Bombardment Wing after 16 February 1951)
- 92nd Bombardment Wing (later 92nd Strategic Aerospace Wing, 92nd Bombardment Wing), 16 June 1952
- 92nd Operations Group, 1 September 1991 – 1 July 1994
- 509th Operations Group, 6 January 1998
- USAF Weapons School, 9 September 2005 – present

=== Stations ===
- Barksdale Field, Louisiana, 1 March 1942
- MacDill Field, Florida, 26 March 1942
- Sarasota Army Air Field, Florida, 18 May–July 1942
- RAF Bovingdon (AAF-112), England, August 1942
- RAF Alconbury (AAF-102), England, January 1943
- RAF Podington (AAF-109), England, 15 September 1943
- Istres Air Base (Y-17), France, June 1945 – 28 February 1946
- Fort Worth Army Air Field, Texas, 4 August 1946
- Smoky Hill Army Air Field, Kansas, 26 October 1946
- Spokane Army Air Field (later Spokane Air Force Base, Fairchild Air Force Base), Washington, 20 June 1947 – 1 July 1994 (deployed to Yokota Air Base, Japan, 9 July–29 October 1950, Andersen Air Force Base, Guam, 16 October 1954 – 12 January 1955 and 26 April–5 July 1956)
- Whiteman Air Force Base, Missouri, 6 January 1998 – present

=== Aircraft ===
- Boeing B-17 Flying Fortress, 1942–1946
- Boeing B-29 Superfortress, 1946, 1947–1951
- Convair B-36 Peacemaker, 1951–1957
- Boeing B-52D Stratofortress, 1957–1971
- Boeing B-52F Stratofortress, 1970-1986
- Boeing B-52H Stratofortress, 1986–1994
- Northrop Grumman B-2 Spirit, 1998–2005

=== Awards and campaigns ===
| Award streamer | Award | Dates | Notes |
|---|---|---|---|
| | Distinguished Unit Citation | 11 January 1944 | Germany, 325th Bombardment Squadron |
| | Distinguished Unit Citation | 11 September 1944 | Germany, 325th Bombardment Squadron |
| | Air Force Outstanding Unit Award with Combat "V" Device | 2 March-30 September 1969 | 325th Bombardment Squadron |
| | Air Force Outstanding Unit Award | 22 August 1953-11 September 1953 | 325th Bombardment Squadron |
| | Air Force Outstanding Unit Award | 3 March 1959-6 October 1959 | 325th Bombardment Squadron |
| | Air Force Outstanding Unit Award | 1 January 1961-31 March 1962 | 325th Bombardment Squadron |
| | Air Force Outstanding Unit Award | 1 July 1967-30 June 1968 | 325th Bombardment Squadron |
| | Air Force Outstanding Unit Award | 1 July 1968-1 October 1968 | 325th Bombardment Squadron |
| | Air Force Outstanding Unit Award | 1 July 1969-30 June 1970 | 325th Bombardment Squadron |
| | Air Force Outstanding Unit Award | 1 July 1972-30 June 1973 | 325th Bombardment Squadron |
| | Air Force Outstanding Unit Award | 1 July 1976-30 June 1977 | 325th Bombardment Squadron |
| | Air Force Outstanding Unit Award | 1 July 1989-30 January 1991 | 325th Bombardment Squadron |
| | Air Force Outstanding Unit Award | 1 July 1991-30 June 1993 | 325th Bombardment Squadron (later 325th Bomb Squadron) |
| | Air Force Outstanding Unit Award | [6 January 1998]-31 May 1999 | 325th Bomb Squadron |
| | Air Force Outstanding Unit Award | 1 June 1999-31 May 2001 | 325th Bomb Squadron |
| | Air Force Outstanding Unit Award | 1 June 2003-31 May 2005 | 325th Bomb Squadron |
| | Air Force Outstanding Unit Award | 1 June 2013-31 May 2015 | 325th Weapons Squadron |
| | Air Force Outstanding Unit Award | 1 June 2019-31 May 2020 | 325th Weapons Squadron |
| | Air Force Outstanding Unit Award | 1 June 2020-31 May 2021 | 325th Weapons Squadron |
| | Republic of Korea Presidential Unit Citation | 10 July-24 October 1950 | 325th Bombardment Squadron |
| | Vietnamese Gallantry Cross with Palm | 2 March-30 September 1969 | 325th Bombardment Squadron |

| Campaign Streamer | Campaign | Dates | Notes |
|---|---|---|---|
| | Antisubmarine | 26 March 1942–July 1942 | 325th Bombardment Squadron |
| | Air Offensive, Europe | August 1942–5 June 1944 | 325th Bombardment Squadron |
| | Air Combat, EAME Theater | August 1942–11 May 1945 | 325th Bombardment Squadron |
| | Normandy | 6 June 1944–24 July 1944 | 325th Bombardment Squadron |
| | Northern France | 25 July 1944–14 September 1944 | 325th Bombardment Squadron |
| | Rhineland | 15 September 1944–21 March 1945 | 325th Bombardment Squadron |
| | Ardennes-Alsace | 16 December 1944–25 January 1945 | 325th Bombardment Squadron |
| | Central Europe | 22 March 1944–21 May 1945 | 325th Bombardment Squadron |
| | UN Defensive | 9 July 1950–15 September 1950 | 325th Bombardment Squadron |
| | UN Offensive | 16 September 1950–29 October 1950 | 325th Bombardment Squadron |

== See also ==
- List of United States Air Force weapons squadrons
- List of B-52 Units of the United States Air Force
- List of B-29 Superfortress operators
- B-17 Flying Fortress units of the United States Army Air Forces
