= 315th Weapons Squadron =

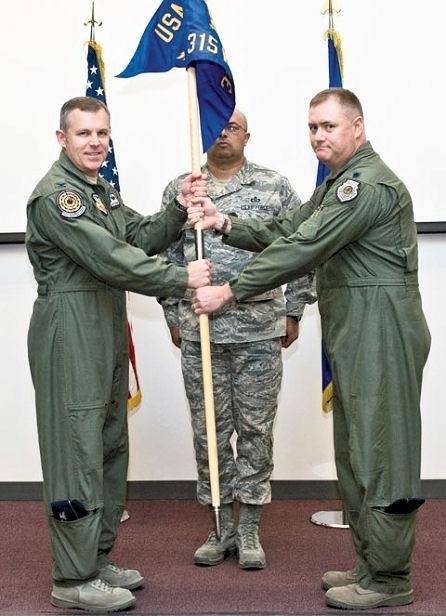
- Col. Robert Garland, USAF Weapons School commandant, activates the 315th Weapons Squadron and Lt. Col. Jason Seyer assumes command, 2 March 2012 at Nellis Air Force Base
- Active: 1958-1993; 2012-present
- Country: United States
- Branch: United States Air Force
- Type: Squadron
- Role: Advanced ICBM Combat Crew Training
- Part of: Air Combat Command
- Garrison/HQ: Nellis Air Force Base, Nevada
- Motto(s): Training – Keystone of Peace (1964-1993)
- Decorations: Air Force Outstanding Unit Award

Insignia
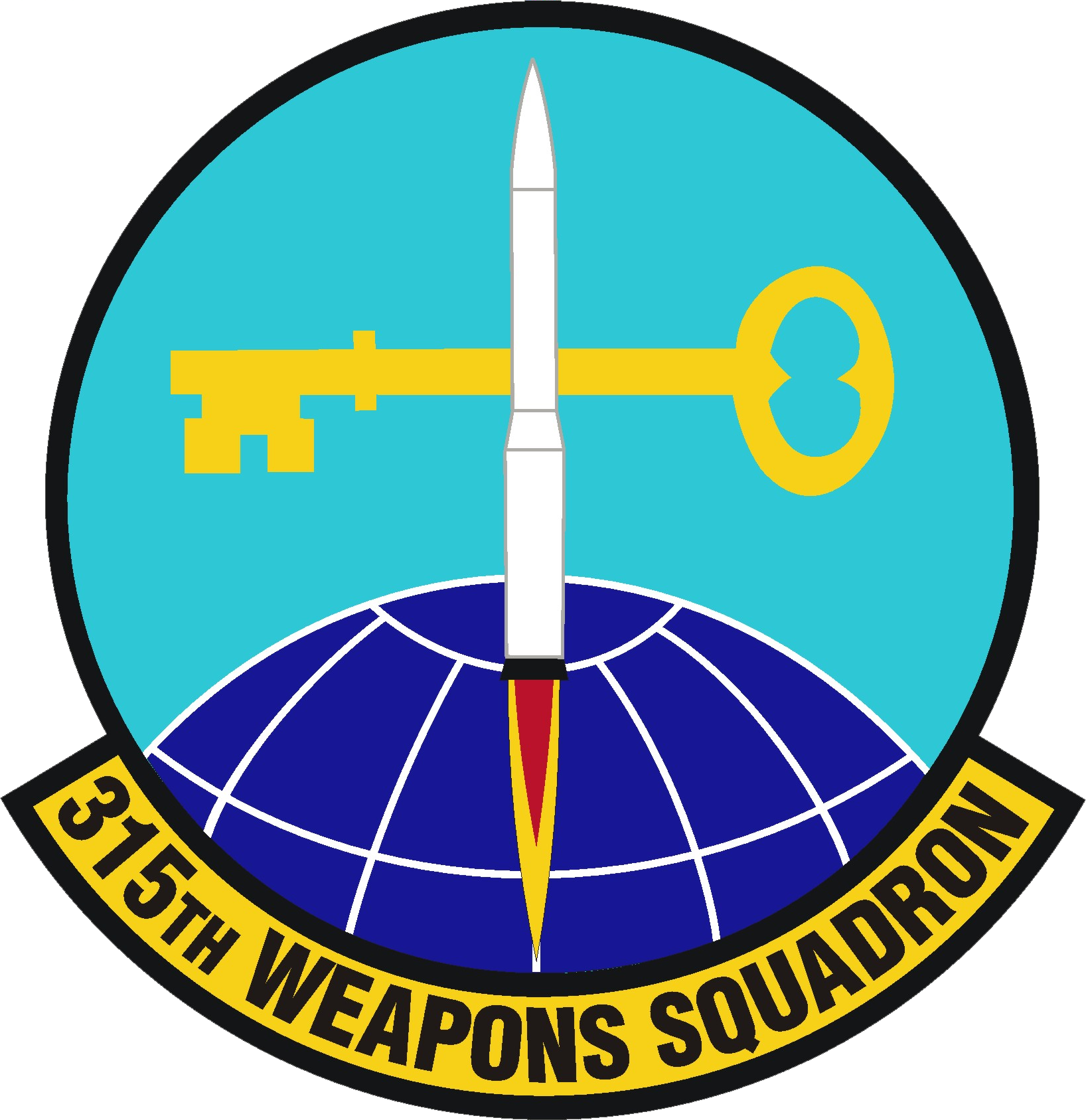
- 315th Weapons Squadron emblem (approved 2 March 2012)

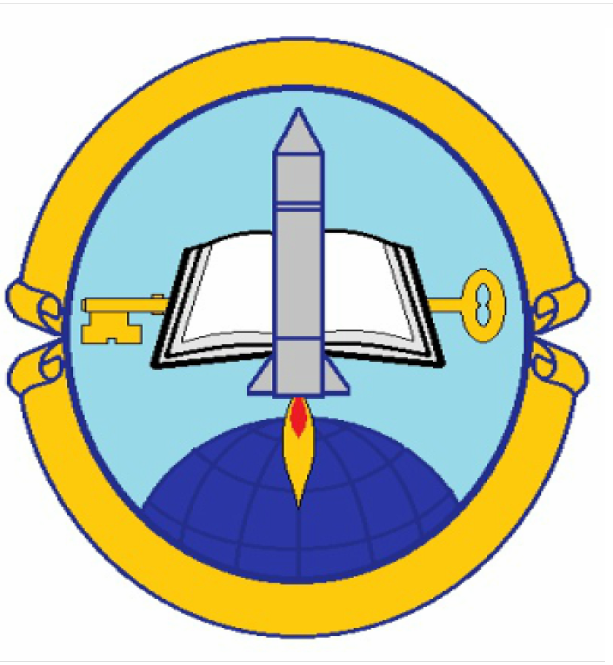
- 4315th Combat Crew Training Squadron emblem(approved 4 May 1964)

The 315th Weapons Squadron is a United States Air Force unit, assigned to the USAF Weapons School at Nellis Air Force Base, Nevada. It is responsible for training a tactics development for the Air Force's intercontinental ballistic missile force. From 1958 through the early 1990s, it was the primary missile training activity for Strategic Air Command as the 4315th Combat Crew Training Squadron.

== History ==
Established as the first USAF intercontinental ballistic missile (ICBM) training squadron at Cooke Air Force Base California in May 1958. As the 4315th Student Squadron, and later 4315th Combat Crew Training Squadron, the unit was responsible for implementing the Strategic Air Command missile combat crew training program. All USAF ICBM crew personnel (Atlas, Titan I, Titan II, Minuteman I, II, II) up to the inactivation of the 4315th in July 1993 were trained at one time or another by this unit. In 1993, Air Education and Training Command assumed the crew training role from Air Combat Command and activated the 381st Training Group to replace the 4315th.

Re-established as the 315th Weapons Squadron as part of the USAF Weapons School at Nellis Air Force Base, Nevada in 2012. Provides the ICBM Weapons Instructor Course.

== Lineage ==
- Designated as the 4315th Student Squadron and organized on 1 May 1958

Redesignated 4315th Combat Crew Training Squadron on 14 May 1963
Inactivated 1 July 1993

- Redesignated 315th Weapons Squadron on 20 January 2012

Activated on 2 March 2012

=== Assignments ===
- 392d Air Base Group, 1 May 1958
- 704th Strategic Missile Wing, 15 November 1958
- 1st Missile Division (later 1st Strategic Aerospace Division), 1 July 1959
- 392d Strategic Missile Wing, 18 October 1961
- 1st Strategic Aerospace Division, 20 December 1961
- Fifteenth Air Force, 31 March 1970
- 1st Strategic Aerospace Division (later Strategic Missile Center), 4 January 1975
- 310th Operations Group, 1 September 1991 – 1 July 1993
- USAF Weapons School, 2 March 2012 – present

=== Stations ===
- Cooke Air Force Base (later Vandenberg Air Force Base), California, 1 May 1958 – 1 July 1993
- Nellis Air Force Base, Nevada, 2 March 2012 – present
