= 34th Weapons Squadron =

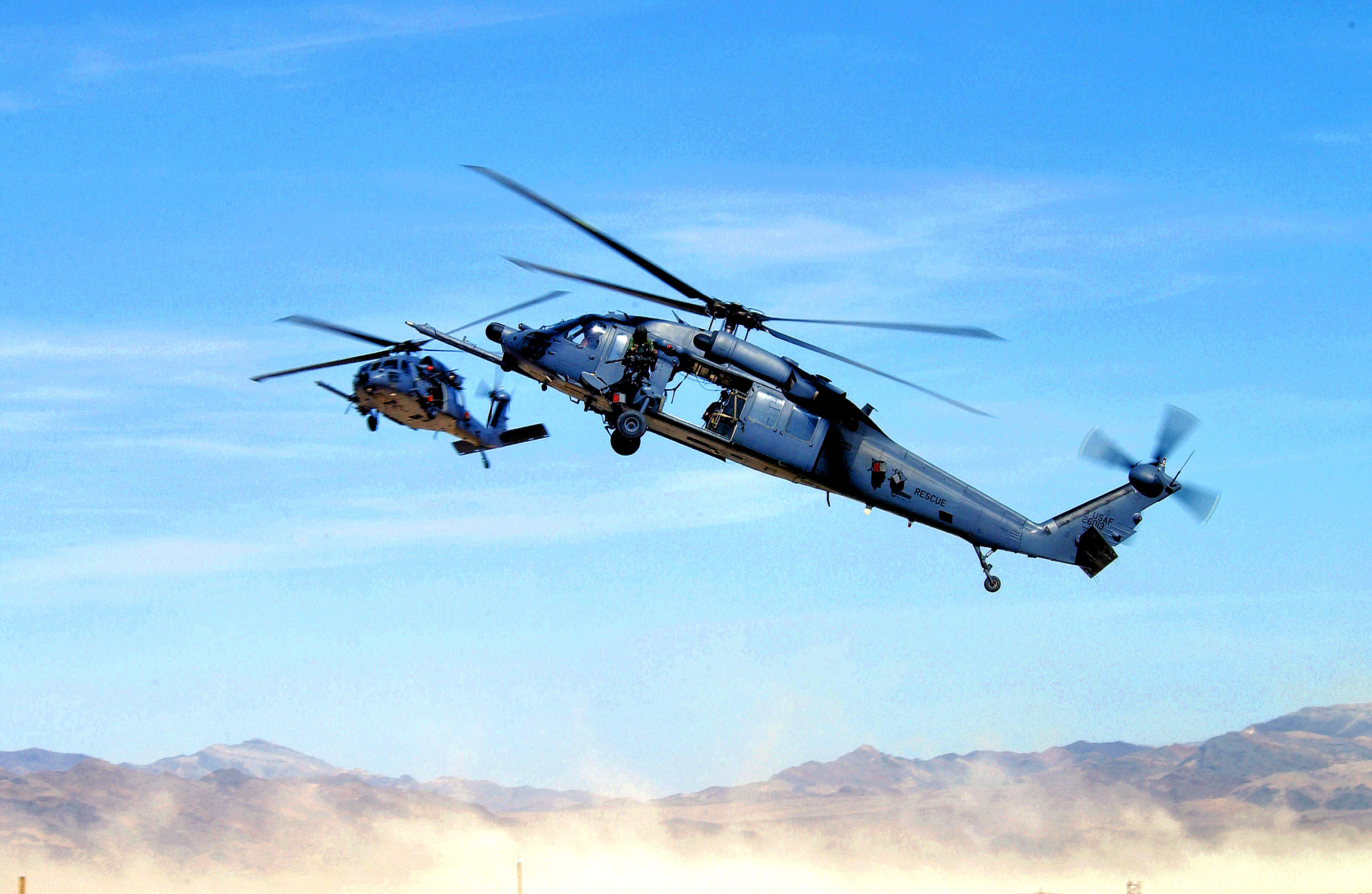
- Two 34th Weapons Squadron HH-60 Pave Hawks maneuver into position to "rescue a downed pilot" during a firepower demonstration
- Active: 1952–1954; 2003–present
- Branch: United States Air Force
- Type: Squadron
- Role: Advanced Air Rescue Training
- Part of: Air Combat Command
- Garrison/HQ: Nellis AFB, Nevada
- Tail Code: "WA"
- Engagements: Korean War
- Decorations: Air Force Outstanding Unit Award

Insignia
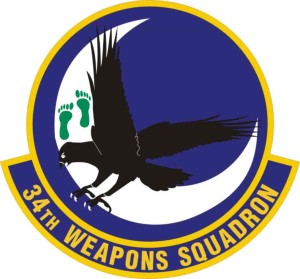
- 34th Weapons Squadron emblem (approved 5 August 2003) (Note: Endicott gives 7 August 1953, the date for the earlier emblem approved for the 34th Air Rescue Squadron.)

The 34th Weapons Squadron is a United States Air Force unit. It is assigned to the USAF Weapons School, stationed at Nellis Air Force Base, Nevada.

The mission of the squadron is to provide HH-60 Pave Hawk instructional flying for air rescue missions.

== History ==
=== Rescue operations ===
The squadron was first activated at Kadena Air Base, Okinawa on 17 October 1952, when Air Rescue Service expanded its existing squadrons into groups and replaced their flights with new squadrons. The squadron absorbed the mission, personnel and equipment of D Flight of the 2d Air Rescue Squadron. The 34th flew the Boeing SB-29 Super Dumbo, a rescue version of the B-29. Its Super Dumbos accompanied Boeing B-29 Superfortresses of Twentieth Air Force, providing strike force rescue escort for bombers flying combat missions to Korea until combat operations ceased in July 1953. The squadron also flew search and rescue missions in the Okinawa area.

The 34th participated in "Duckbutt" missions, flying rescue and recovery orbits to assist damaged or lost aircraft recovering to Japan after missions during the Korean War. The SB-29 dropped wooden boats and parajumpers to recover lost aircrew. With the reduction of US forces in the Pacific following the end of hostilities in Korea, the 34th was inactivated on 8 September 1954.

=== Advanced training ===
The USAF Weapons School HH-60G Division had its origins in the establishment of the USAF Combat Rescue School at Nellis Air Force Base, Nevada in 1993. In 1995, Air Combat Command consolidated the mission of the Rescue School within the 57th Wing. On 7 July 1995, the HH-60G Division of the USAF Weapons School was organized. In 2003, the division was replaced by the 34th Weapons Squadron, which became an instructional squadron at the Weapons School, equipped with HH-60 Pave Hawk for PJ and helicopter pilot rescue training.

== Lineage ==
- Constituted as the 34th Air Rescue Squadron on 17 October 1952

Activated on 14 November 1952
Inactivated on 8 September 1954

- Redesignated 34th Weapons Squadron on 24 January 2003

Activated on 3 February 2003

=== Assignments ===
- 2d Air Rescue Group, 14 November 1952 – 8 September 1954 (attached to Twentieth Air Force, 1 June 1953 – 31 July 1954)
- USAF Weapons School, 3 February 2003 – present

=== Stations ===
- Kadena Air Base, Okinawa, 14 November 1952 – 8 September 1954
- Nellis Air Force Base, Nevada, 3 February 2003 – present

=== Aircraft ===
- Boeing SB-29 Super Dumbo, 1952–1954
- Sikorsky H-5 Dragonfly, 1952–1954
- Sikorsky H-19 Chickasaw, 1952–1953
- Douglas C-47 Skytrain, 1952–1954
- Douglas SC-47 Skytrain, 1952–1954
