= 8th Weapons Squadron =

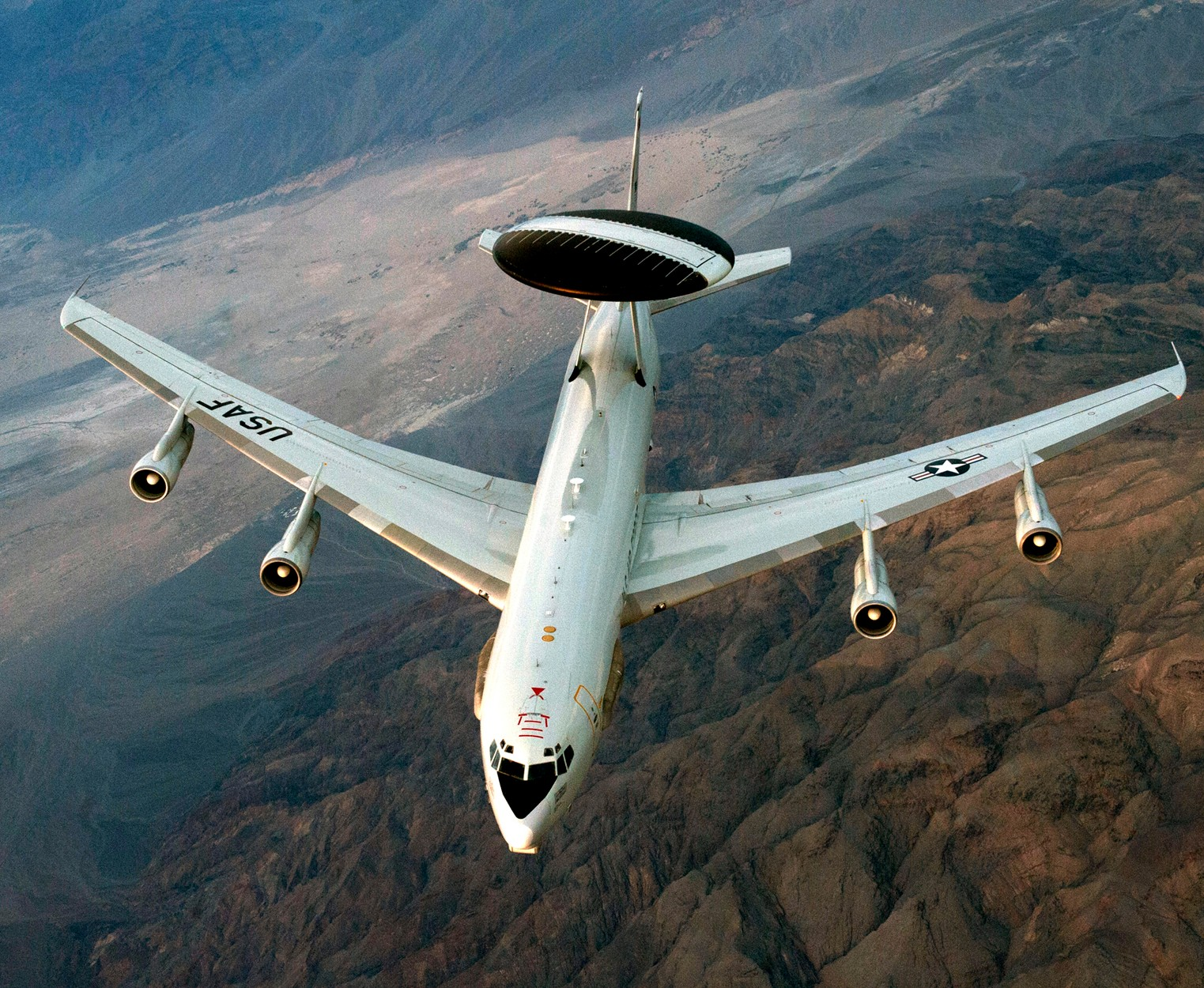
- E-3B/C/G AWACS
- Active: 1942–1944; 1944–1946; 1949–1952; 1952; 1969–1971; 1972–1996; 2003–present
- Country: United States
- Branch: United States Air Force
- Type: Squadron
- Role: Advanced Airborne Command and Control Training
- Part of: Air Combat Command
- Garrison/HQ: Nellis AFB, Nevada
- Engagements: World War II (Asia-Pacific Theater) 1991 Gulf War (Defense of Saudi Arabia; Liberation of Kuwait)

- Decorations: Air Force Outstanding Unit Award (10x) Philippine Presidential Unit Citation

Insignia
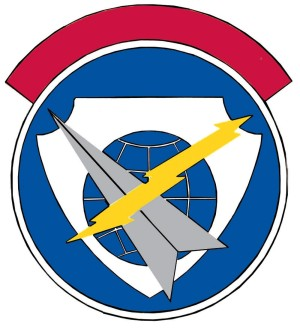
- 8th Weapons Squadron emblem (approved 30 May 1973)

The 8th Weapons Squadron is a non-flying United States Air Force unit, assigned to the USAF Weapons School at Nellis Air Force Base, Nevada.

The squadron inherited the lineage of the 8th Airborne Command and Control Squadron which was raised as the 8th Combat Cargo Squadron which flew Curtiss C-46 Commandos and Douglas C-47 Skytrains in the CBI Theater during World War 2. The 8th Airborne Command and Control Squadron flew the EC-135 to provide airborne command and control for deploying fighter squadrons over the Atlantic Ocean, and supporting the movement of key Air Combat Command leadership.

== Overview ==
Provides advanced training for Airborne Warning and Control System and Ground Theater Air Control System officers. Also includes training to weapons officers for the E-3 Airborne Warning and Control System (AWACS), Command and Reporting Center (CRC), RC-135 Rivet Joint, EC-130H Compass Call and the E-8 Joint Surveillance Target Attack Radar System (JSTARS) communities.

== History ==
=== World War II ===
The first predecessor of the squadron was the 8th Ferrying Squadron, which ferried aircraft to combat theaters and to Brazil from the Southeast United States under the lend-lease program using the Air Transport Command South Atlantic air ferry route, Mar 1942-Mar 1944.

The second predecessor of the squadron provided air transportation in Southwestern and Western Pacific, Nov 1944-Sep 1945 as the 8th Combat Cargo Squadron, operating under Fifth Air Force. It operated from Biak to fly passengers and cargo to bases in Australia, New Guinea, the Admiralties, and the Philippines. Also dropped supplies to US and guerrilla forces in the Philippines. Moved to Leyte in May 1945. Maintained flights to bases in Australia, New Guinea, and the Philippines; transported personnel and supplies to the Ryukyus, and evacuated casualties on return flights. Transported personnel and equipment of the occupation forces to Japan and ferried liberated prisoners of war to the Philippines. Moved to Japan in September 1945 where it operated until being inactivated in January 1946.

=== Helicopter operations ===
The third predecessor of the squadron was activated as the 8th Helicopter Flight under Caribbean Air Command in 1949. It operated cargo flights from Albrook Air Force Base providing logistical and supply support to installations in Panama and Latin America, Oct 1949-Feb 1952.

=== Airborne command and control ===
Reactivated in 1972 as EC-135 Airborne command post for tactical deployments worldwide, Feb 1972-May 1996. Has been involved in every United States combat operation since the Vietnam War. Deployed personnel and equipment to Spain and airfield personnel and equipment into Saudi Arabia, Aug 1990-c. Mar 1991 as part of Operation Desert Shield/Desert Storm.

=== From 1978 ===
Its current squadron was formed in 1978, when the concept of Air Weapons Controller was added to the established concept of Fighter Weapons. The first Air Weapons Controllers graduated in December 1984 to become Fighter Weapons School instructors. Instruction at the 8th Weapons Squadron continues to this very day in the fields of United States Air Force tactical air control system (TACS), Air Battle Management (ABM), Electronic Warfare Support (ES), Electronic attack (EA) and their integration in operations. The course has graduated over 350 instructors who have been key to every conflict and contingency since 1985.

== Lineage ==
8th Ferrying Squadron

- Constituted as the 8th Air Corps Ferrying Squadron on 18 February 1942

Activated on 24 March 1942
Redesignated 8th Ferrying Squadron on 12 May 1943
Disbanded on 31 Mar 1944
Reconstituted and consolidated with the 8th Tactical Deployment Control Squadron, the 8th Combat Cargo Squadron and the 8th Helicopter Flight as the 8th Tactical Deployment Control Squadron on 19 September 1985

8th Combat Cargo Squadron

- Constituted as the 8th Combat Cargo Squadron on 25 April 1944

Activated on 1 May 1944
Inactivated on 15 January 1946
Disbanded on 8 October 1948
Reconstituted and consolidated with the 8th Tactical Deployment Control Squadron, the 8th Ferrying Squadron and the 8th Helicopter Flight as the 8th Tactical Deployment Control Squadron on 19 September 1985

8th Helicopter Flight

- Constituted as the 8th Helicopter Flight on 7 October 1949

Activated on 27 October 1949
Inactivated on 19 February 1952

- Activated on 14 March 1952

Inactivated on 16 December 1952
Consolidated with the 8th Tactical Deployment Control Squadron, the 8th Ferrying Squadron and the 8th Combat Cargo Squadron as the 8th Tactical Deployment Control Squadron on 19 September 1985

8th Weapons Squadron

- Constituted as the 8th Airborne Command and Control Squadron on 14 August 1969

Activated on 15 October 1969
Inactivated on 8 March 1971

- Activated on 1 February 1972

Redesignated 8th Tactical Deployment Control Squadron on 30 April 1974
Consolidated with the 8th Ferrying Squadron, the 8th Combat Cargo Squadron and the 8th Helicopter Flight on 19 September 1985
Redesignated 8th Air Deployment Control Squadron on 1 November 1990
Redesignated 8th Airborne Command and Control Squadron on 1 July 1994
Inactivated on 15 May 1996

- Redesignated 8th Weapons Squadron on 24 January 2003

Activated on 3 February 2003

=== Assignments ===
- Nashville Sector, Ferrying Command (later Nashville Sector, Domestic Wing, Ferrying Command; 4th Ferrying Group), 24 March 1942 – 31 March 1944
- 2d Combat Cargo Group, 1 May 1944 – 15 January 1946 (attached to 5298th Troop Carrier Wing (Provisional), November–December 1944)
- 5700th Air Base Group, 27 October 1949 – 19 February 1952
- Eighteenth Air Force (attached to 16th Troop Carrier Squadron), 14 March–16 December 1952
- 4500th Air Base Wing, 15 October 1969 – 8 March 1971
- Tactical Air Command, 1 February 1972
- 552d Airborne Warning and Control Wing (later 552d Airborne Warning and Control Division; 552d Airborne Warning and Control Wing), 1 January 1978
- 28th Air Division, 1 March 1986
- 552d Operations Group, 29 May 1992 – 15 May 1996
- USAF Weapons School, 3 February 2003 – present

=== Stations ===
- Berry Field, Tennessee, 24 March 1942
- Memphis Municipal Airport, Tennessee, 9 December 1942 – 31 March 1944
- Syracuse Army Air Base, New York, 1 May 1944
- Baer Field, Indiana, 6–27 October 1944
- Finschhafen Airfield, New Guinea, November 1944
- Mokmer Airfield, Biak, New Guinea, January 1945
- Dulag Airfield, Leyte, 19 March 1945
- Okinawa, 25 Aug 1945
- Yokota Air Base, Japan, September 1945 – 15 January 1946
- Albrook Air Force Base, Panama Canal Zone, 27 October 1949 – 19 February 1952
- Sewart Air Force Base, Tennessee, 14 March–16 December 1952
- Langley Air Force Base, Virginia, 15 October 1969 – 8 March 1971
- Seymour Johnson Air Force Base, North Carolina, 1 February 1972
- Tinker Air Force Base, Oklahoma, 15 June 1978 – 15 May 1996
- Nellis Air Force Base, Nevada, 3 February 2003 – present

=== Aircraft ===
- None (ferried aircraft), 1942–1944
- Curtiss C-46 Commando, 1944–1945
- Douglas C-47 Skytrain, 1944, 1945
- Sikorsky H-5 Dragonfly, 1949–1952
- Sikorsky H-19 Chickasaw (Helicopter), 1952
- Lockheed EC-121 Warning Star, 1969–1970
- Boeing C-135 Stratolifter, 1969-1972
- Boeing EC-135, 1972-1996
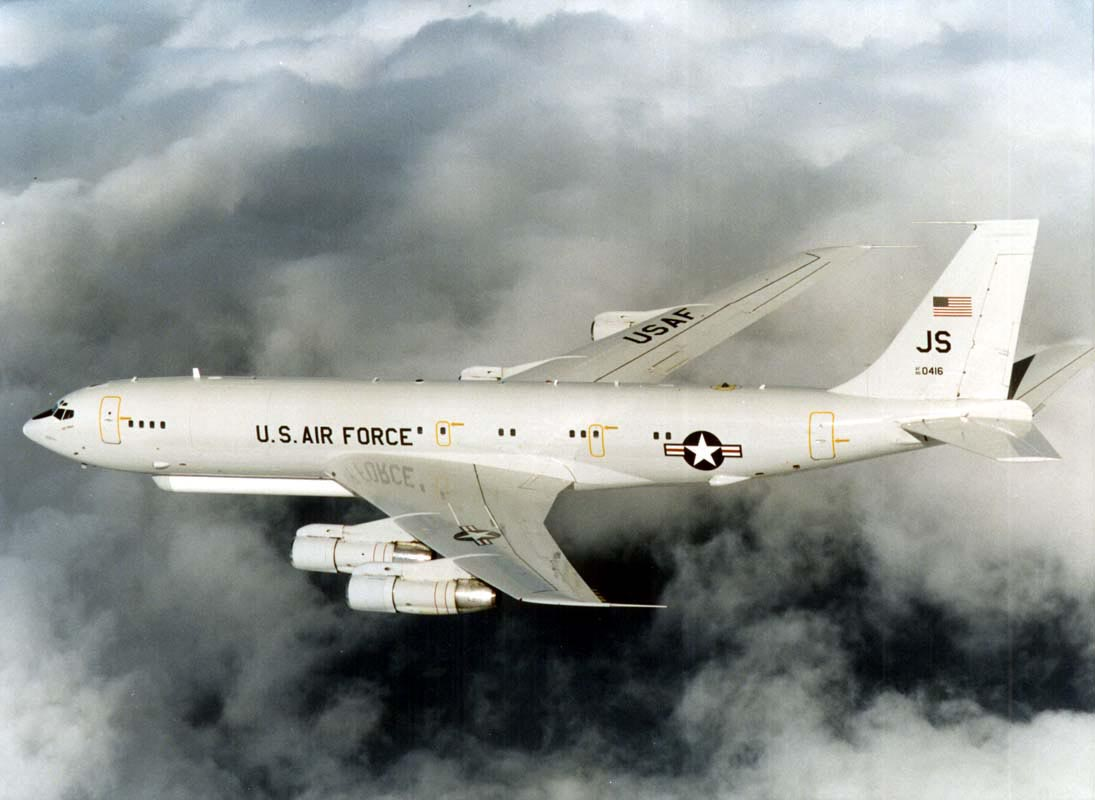
E-8C JSTARS

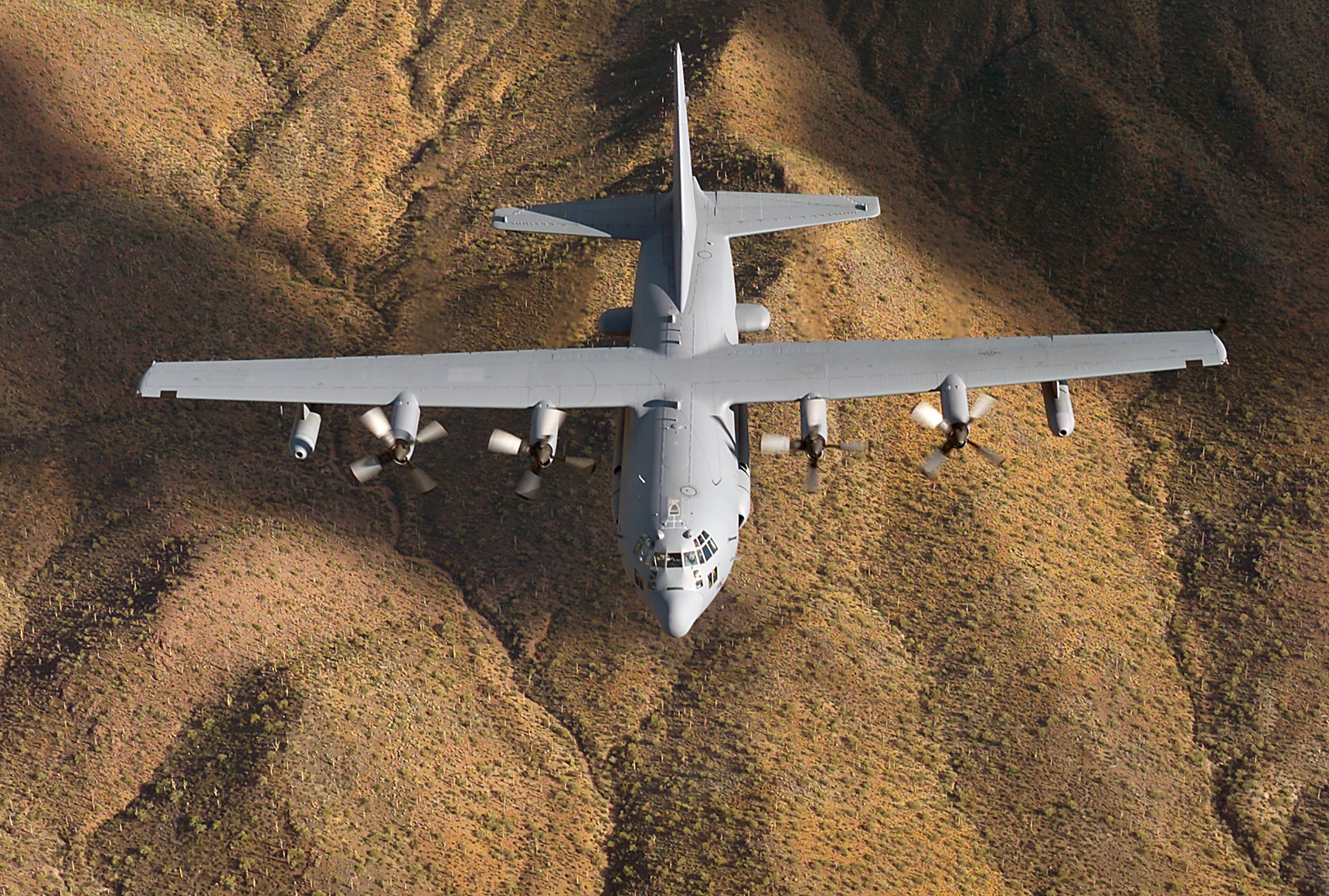
EC-130H Compass Call

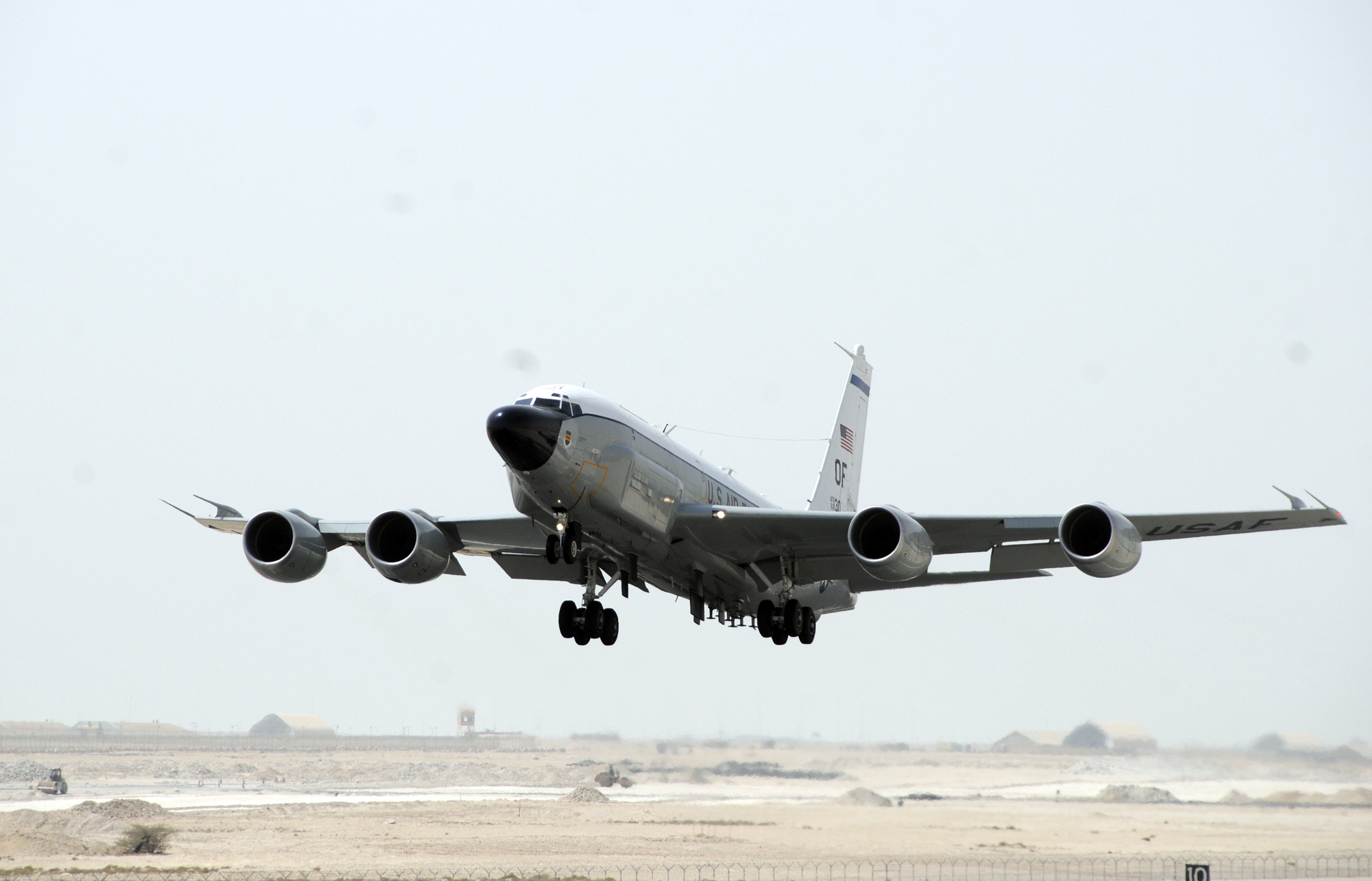
RC-135 Rivet Joint
