= 829th Bombardment Squadron =

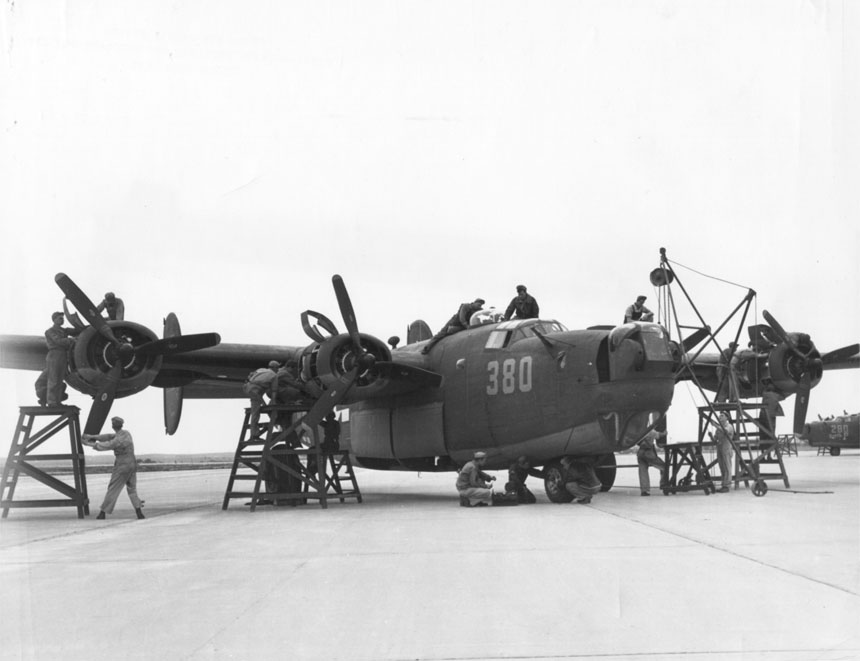
- B-24 Liberator as flown by the 829th Squadron
- Active: 1943-1946
- Country: United States
- Branch: United States Air Force
- Role: heavy bomber
- Part of: Fifteenth Air Force
- Engagements: Mediterranean Theater of Operations
- Decorations: Distinguished Unit Citation

Insignia
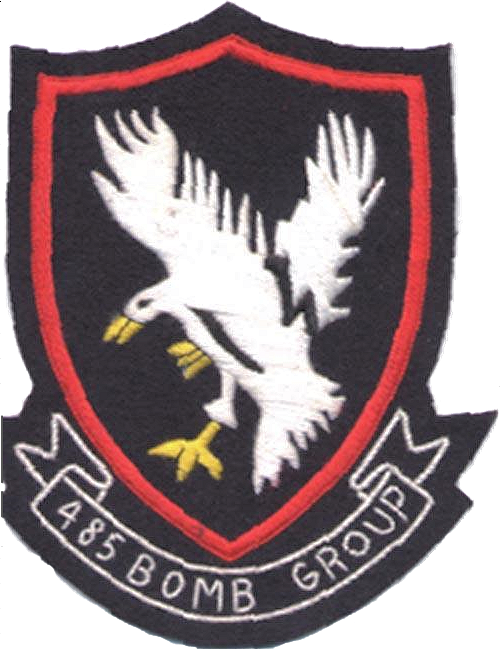
- 829th Bombardment Squadron emblem

The 829th Bombardment Squadron was a squadron of the United States Army Air Forces. It was active during World War II in the Mediterranean Theater of Operations as a Consolidated B-24 Liberator unit, where it earned a Distinguished Unit Citation. Following V-E Day, the squadron returned to the United States and began training with the Boeing B-29 Superfortress at Smoky Hill Army Air Field, Kansas, before inactivating in August 1946.

== History ==
The squadron was activated at Fairmont Army Air Field, Nebraska as one of the four that made up the 485th Bombardment Group. It trained with Consolidated B-24 Liberators until March 1944, when it deployed to the Mediterranean Theater of Operations in March 1944. The squadron's ground echelon arrived at its base at Venosa Airfield, Italy in April, but when the air echelon arrived in theater, it remained in Tunisia for additional training.

The squadron entered combat in May 1944, and primarily flew long range strategic bombing missions against targets in Italy, France, Germany, Austria, Hungary, Romania, and Yugoslavia, bombing marshalling yards, oil refineries, airfields, heavy industry, and other strategic objectives. The squadron was awarded a Distinguished Unit Citation for continuing an attack on an oil refinery near Vienna, Austria on 26 June 1944 despite heavy fighter opposition.

The 829th was occasionally diverted from the strategic campaign to carry out some support and interdiction operations. It struck bridges, harbors, and troop concentrations in August 1944 to aid with Operation Dragoon, the invasion of Southern France. It also hit communications lines and other targets during March and April 1945 to support the advance of the British Eighth Army in northern Italy.

The unit departed Italy in May 1945. In late July, it reassembled at Sioux City Army Air Base, Iowa and was redesignated as a very heavy unit the following month. In September, it moved to Smoky Hill Army Air Field, Kansas and began training with Boeing B-29 Superfortresses. When Strategic Air Command was formed in March 1946, the squadron became one of its first operational squadrons. In August 1946, the squadron was inactivated and its mission, personnel and B-29s were transferred to the 342d Bombardment Squadron, which was simultaneously activated at Smoky Hill.

== Lineage ==
- Constituted as the 829th Bombardment Squadron (Heavy) on 14 September 1943

Activated on 20 September 1943
Redesignated 829th Bombardment Squadron, Heavy c. 1944
Redesignated 829th Bombardment Squadron, Very Heavy on 5 August 1945
Inactivated on 4 August 1946

=== Assignments ===
- 485th Bombardment Group, 20 September 1943 – 4 August 1946

=== Stations ===
- Fairmont Army Air Field, Nebraska, 20 September 1943 – 11 March 1944
- Venosa Airfield, Italy, c. 30 April 1944 – c. 9 May 1945
- Sioux City Army Air Base, Iowa, 24 July 1945
- Smoky Hill Army Air Field, Kansas, 8 September 1945 – 4 August 1946

=== Aircraft ===
- Consolidated B-24 Liberator, 1943–1945
- Boeing B-29 Superfortress, 1945–1946

=== Awards and campaigns ===
Award streamer	Award	Dates	Notes
	Distinguished Unit Citation	26 June 1944	Vienna Austria 828th Bombardment Squadron

Campaign Streamer	Campaign	Dates	Notes
	Air Offensive, Europe	c. 9 May 1944–5 June 1944	829th Bombardment Squadron
	Air Combat, EAME Theater	c. 9 May 1944–11 May 1945	829th Bombardment Squadron
	Central Europe	c. 9 May 1944–21 May 1945	829th Bombardment Squadron
	Rome-Arno	c. 9 May 1944–9 September 1944	829th Bombardment Squadron
	Normandy	6 June 1944–24 July 1944	829th Bombardment Squadron
	Northern France	25 July 1944–14 September 1944	829th Bombardment Squadron
	Southern France	15 August 1944–14 September 1944	829th Bombardment Squadron
	North Apennines	10 September 1944–4 April 1945	829th Bombardment Squadron
	Rhineland	15 September 1944–21 March 1945	829th Bombardment Squadron
	Po Valley	3 April 1945–8 May 1945	829th Bombardment Squadron

== See also ==
- B-24 Liberator units of the United States Army Air Forces
- List of B-29 Superfortress operators
