= 830th Bombardment Squadron =

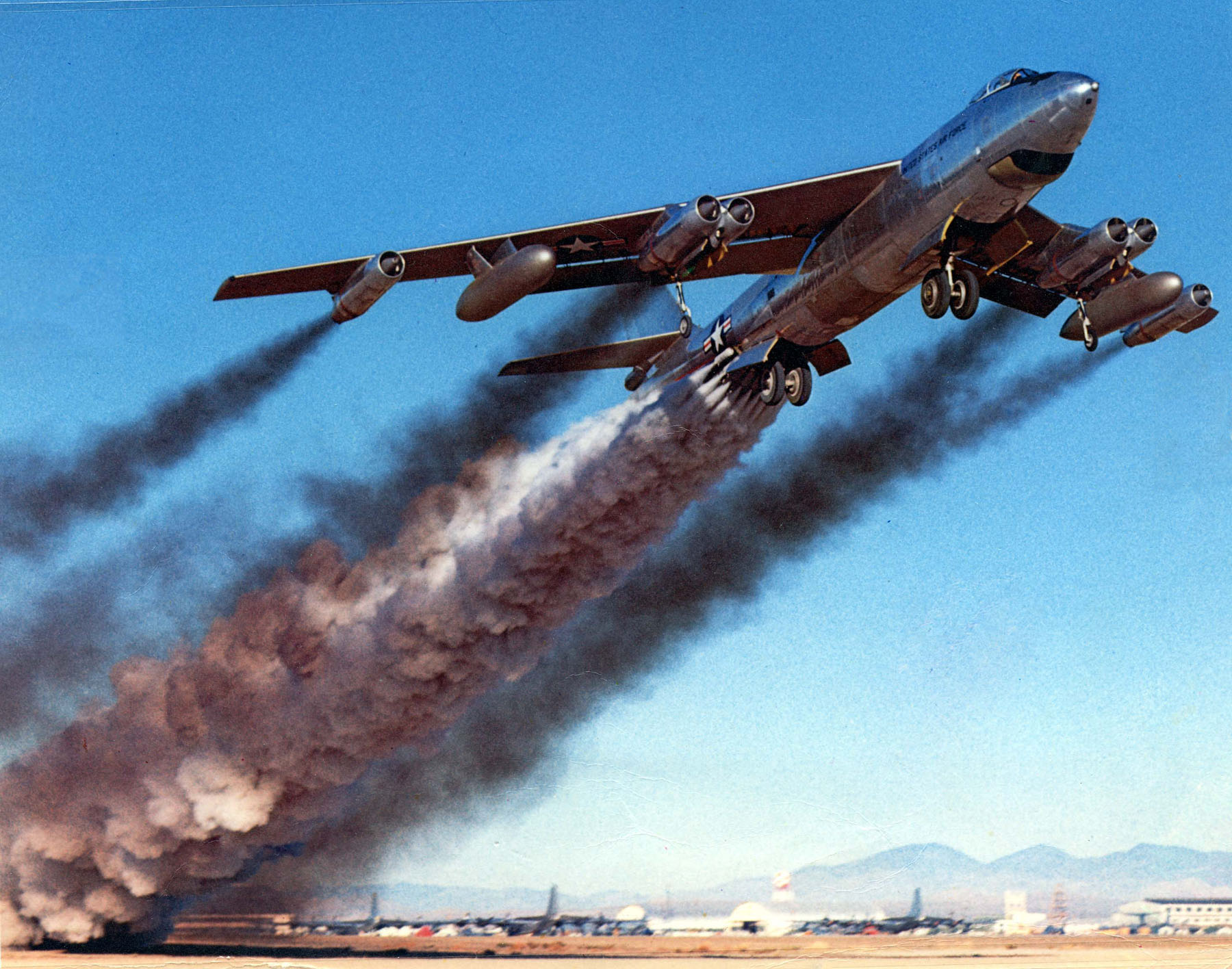
- B-47 Stratojet rocket-assisted take off
- Active: 1943–1966
- Country: United States
- Branch: United States Air Force
- Role: medium bomber
- Mottos: Vamos Siganos (Spanish for 'We are Going, Follow Us')
- Engagements: Mediterranean Theater of Operations
- Decorations: Distinguished Unit Citation

Insignia
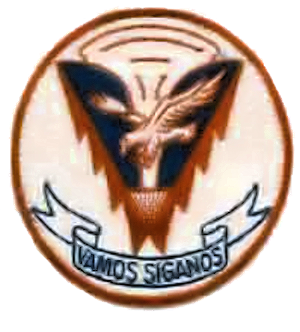
- Patch with 830th Bombardment Squadron emblem (Note: Approved 20 September 1955. Description: A light blue triangle, edged on two sides with eight stylized red lightning flashes, four and four, all outlined Air Force blue; an earth section issuing from base of the triangle and rising therefrom a mushroom cloud all white, outline and detail Air Force blue, over the center of the cloud a white silhouetted eagle volant, outline and detail of the second color.)

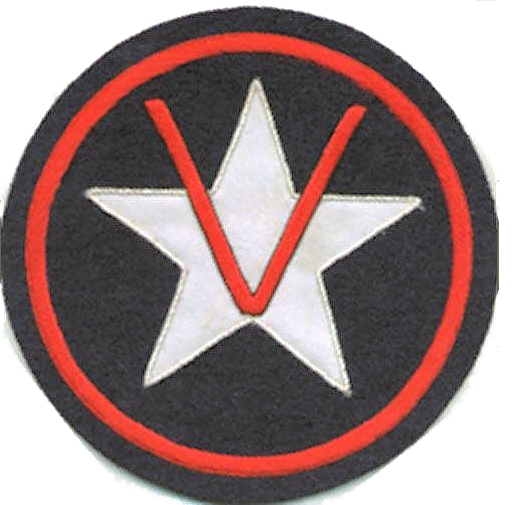
- 830th Bombardment Squadron emblem (World War II)

The 830th Bombardment Squadron is an inactive United States Air Force unit. Its last assignment was with the 509th Bombardment Wing at Pease Air Force Base, New Hampshire. It was active during World War II in the Mediterranean Theater of Operations as a Consolidated B-24 Liberator unit, where it participated in the strategic bombing campaign against Germany. It earned a Distinguished Unit Citation. Following V-E Day, the squadron returned to the United States and began training with the Boeing B-29 Superfortress at Smoky Hill Army Air Field, Kansas. When its parent group was inactivated in 1946, it moved to Roswell Army Air Field, New Mexico, where it joined the United States' first nuclear-capable unit, the 509th Composite Group. The squadron remained part of the 509th until it was inactivated when the wing converted to the Boeing B-52 Stratofortress.

== History ==
=== World War II ===
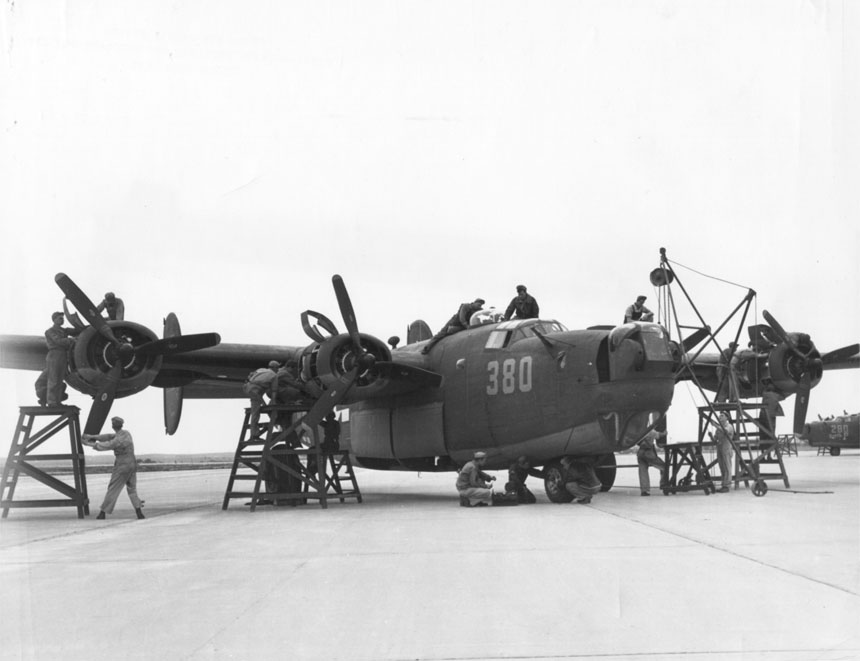
B-24 Liberator as flown by the 830th Squadron

The squadron was activated at Fairmont Army Air Field, Nebraska as one of the four that made up the 485th Bombardment Group. It trained with Consolidated B-24 Liberators until March 1944, when it deployed to the Mediterranean Theater of Operations. The squadron's ground echelon arrived at its base at Venosa Airfield, Italy in April, but when the air echelon arrived in theater, it remained in Tunisia for additional training.

The squadron entered combat in May 1944, and primarily flew during the long range strategic bombing missions against targets in Italy, France, Germany, Austria, Hungary, Romania, and Yugoslavia, bombing marshalling yards, oil refineries, airfields, heavy industry, and other strategic objectives. The squadron was awarded a Distinguished Unit Citation for continuing an attack on an oil refinery near Vienna, Austria on 26 June 1944 despite heavy fighter opposition.

The 830th was occasionally diverted from the strategic campaign to carry out some support and interdiction operations. It struck bridges, harbors, and troop concentrations in August 1944 to aid with Operation Dragoon, the invasion of Southern France. It also hit communications lines and other targets during March and April 1945 to support the advance of the British Eighth Army in northern Italy in Operation Grapeshot.

The unit departed Italy in May 1945. In late July, it reassembled at Sioux City Army Air Base, Iowa and was redesignated as a very heavy unit the following month. In September, it moved to Smoky Hill Army Air Field, Kansas and began training with Boeing B-29 Superfortresses.

=== Strategic Air Command ===
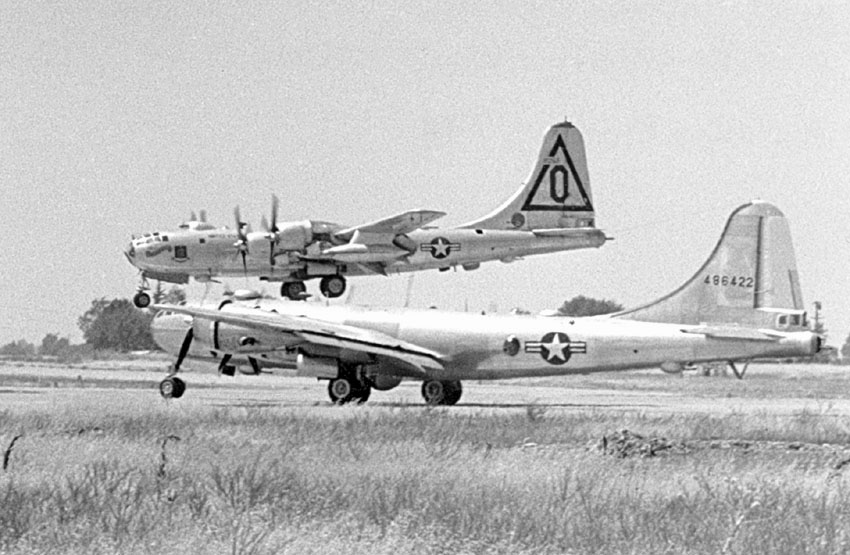
B-50 and B-29 bombers

When Strategic Air Command (SAC) was formed in March 1946, the squadron became one of its first operational squadrons. In May 1946, the 830th became part of the 509th Composite Group and moved to Walker Army Air Field the following month. The 509th Group, soon redesignated the 509th Bombardment Group, "provided the nucleus for [SAC]'s atomic striking force". Group crews and aircraft participated in Operation Crossroads, atomic testing in the Marshall Islands during 1946. With the advent of the Convair B-36 Peacemaker, the B-29 was no longer considered a very heavy bomber, and the squadron was redesignated as a medium unit in July 1948.

The squadron began upgrading to the Boeing B-50 Superfortress, an advanced version of the B-29 in 1949. The B-50 gave the unit the capability to carry heavy loads of conventional weapons faster and farther as well as being designed for atomic bomb missions if necessary. SAC’s mobilization for the Korean War highlighted that SAC wing commanders focused too much on running the base organization and did not spend enough time on overseeing actual combat preparations. To allow wing commanders the ability to focus on combat operations, the air base group commander became responsible for managing the base housekeeping functions. In February 1951, the 509th Group became nonoperational and the squadron was attached directly to the 509th Bombardment Wing, and was assigned directly to the wing in June 1952.

The squadron deployed as an element of the wing to SAC airfields in England three times, and once to Andersen Air Force Base, Guam on long-term deployments in the 1950s. The squadron moved into the jet age when it received new, swept wing Boeing B-47 Stratojets in 1955. Three years later, the squadron moved to a new base at Pease Air Force Base, New Hampshire, where it continued to operate the Stratojet. The squadron became non-operational in November 1965, as the 509th Wing prepared for inactivation. This plan was changed and the wing converted to the Boeing B-52 Stratofortress instead. However, under SAC's dispersal plan, B-52 wings had only a single bombardment squadron, and the 830th was inactivated on 25 June 1966.

== Lineage ==
- Constituted as the 830th Bombardment Squadron (Heavy) on 14 September 1943

Activated on 20 September 1943
Redesignated 830th Bombardment Squadron, Heavy c. 1944
Redesignated 830th Bombardment Squadron, Very Heavy on 5 August 1945
Redesignated 830th Bombardment Squadron, Medium on 2 July 1948
Inactivated on 25 June 1966

=== Assignments ===
- 485th Bombardment Group, 20 September 1943
- 509th Composite Group (later 509th Bombardment Group), 6 May 1946 (attached to 509th Bombardment Wing, 17 November 1947 – 1 August 1948, 1 August 1948 – 14 September 1948 (Note: The 509th Bombardment Wing, a table of distribution unit was organized under the experimental wing base reorganization of the Army Air Forces. When the reorganization was made permanent, it was replaced by a new 509th Bombardment Wing, a table of organization unit, on 1 August 1948. The two were later consolidated. Ravenstein, p. 276.) and after 1 February 1951)
- 509th Bombardment Wing, 16 June 1952 – 25 June 1966

=== Stations ===
- Fairmont Army Air Field, Nebraska, 20 September 1943 – 11 March 1944
- Venosa Airfield, Italy, c. 30 April 1944 – c. 9 May 1945
- Sioux City Army Air Base, Iowa, 24 July 1945
- Smoky Hill Army Air Field, Kansas, 8 September 1945
- Roswell Army Air Field (Later Walker Air Force Base), New Mexico, 23 June 1946
- Pease Air Force Base, New Hampshire, 1 July 1958 – 25 June 1966

=== Aircraft ===
- Consolidated B-24 Liberator, 1943–1945
- Boeing B-29 Superfortress, 1945–1952
- Boeing B-50 Superfortress, 1951–1955
- Boeing B-47 Stratojet, 1955–1966

Award streamer	Award	Dates	Notes
	Distinguished Unit Citation	26 June 1944	Vienna, Austria

Campaign Streamer	Campaign	Dates	Notes
	Air Offensive, Europe	c. 9 May 1944 – 5 June 1944	
	Air Combat, EAME Theater	c. 9 May 1944 – 11 May 1945	
	Central Europe	c. 9 May 1944 – 21 May 1945	
	Rome-Arno	c. 9 May 1944 – 9 September 1944	
	Normandy	6 June 1944 – 24 July 1944	
	Northern France	25 July 1944 – 14 September 1944	
	Southern France	15 August 1944 – 14 September 1944	
	North Apennines	10 September 1944 – 4 April 1945	
	Rhineland	15 September 1944 – 21 March 1945	
	Po Valley	3 April 1945 – 8 May 1945	

== See also ==
- B-24 Liberator units of the United States Army Air Forces
- List of B-29 Superfortress operators
- List of B-47 units of the United States Air Force
