= 519th Air Defense Group =

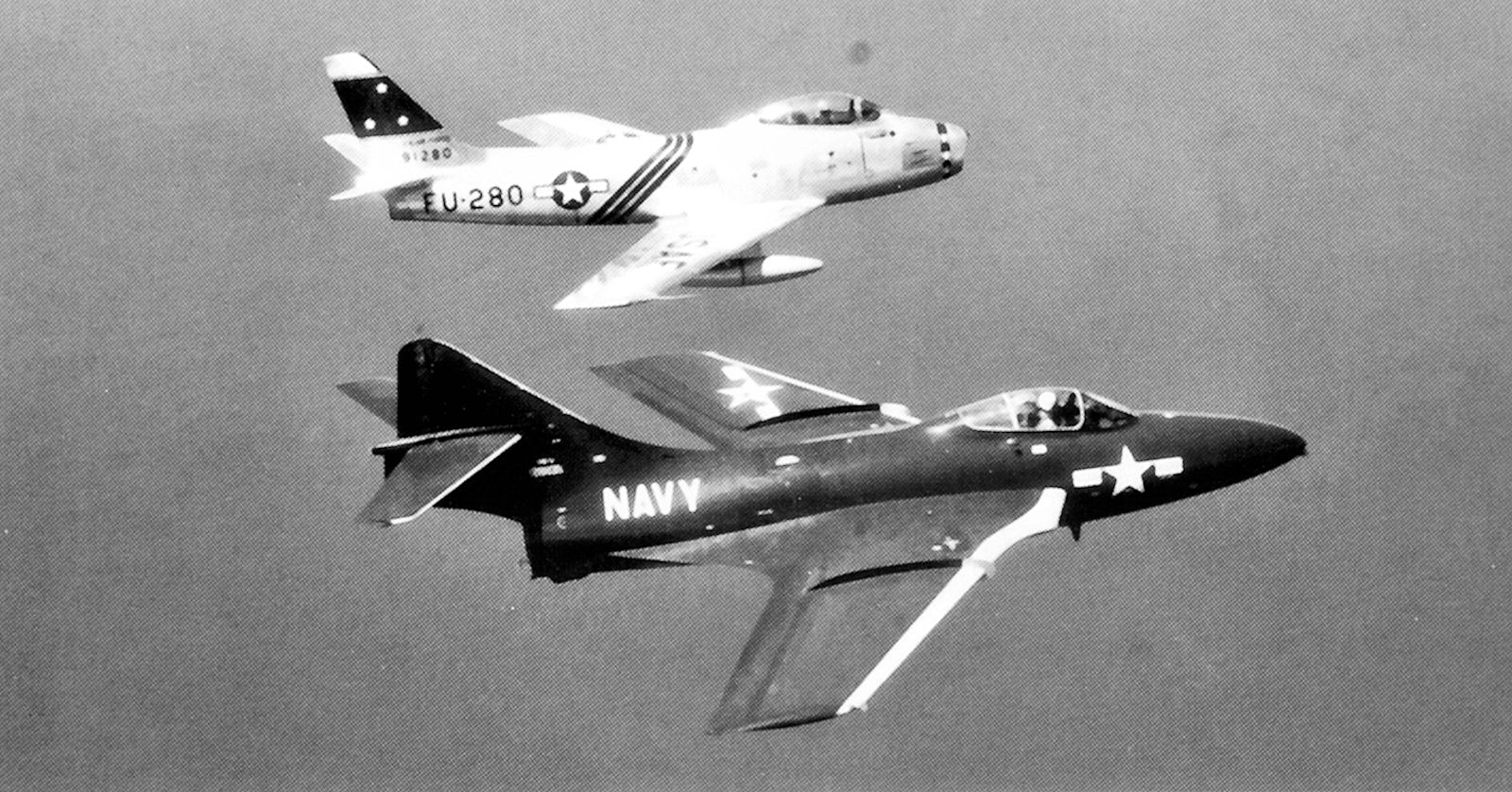
- F-86A Sabre of the group's 75th Fighter-Interceptor Squadron with US Navy F9F Cougar off Long Island (Note: Aircraft is North American F-86A-5-NA Sabre, serial 49-1280. This aircraft was transferred to the Indiana Air National Guard. It was sent to the Military Aircraft Storage and Disposal Center on 17 February 1958 and scrapped on 27 May 1958. Baugher, Joe (7 April 2023). "1949 USAF Serial Numbers". Joe Baugher.)
- Active: 1945–1947; 1953–1955
- Country: United States
- Branch: United States Air Force
- Type: Fighter interceptor
- Role: Air defense

The 519th Air Defense Group is a disbanded United States Air Force organization. Its last assignment was with the 4709th Air Defense Wing, stationed at Suffolk County Air Force Base, New York, where it was inactivated in 1955. The group was originally activated as the 519th Air Service Group, a support unit for the 485th Bombardment Group at the end of World War II in Italy and then redeployed to the United States where it was inactivated in 1945.

The group was activated once again in 1953, when Air Defense Command ADC established it as the headquarters for a dispersed fighter-interceptor squadron and the medical, maintenance, and administrative squadrons supporting it. It was replaced in 1955 when ADC transferred its mission, equipment, and personnel to the 52d Fighter Group in a project that replaced air defense groups commanding fighter squadrons with fighter groups with distinguished records during World War II.

== History ==
=== World War II and Post-War ===
The group was activated as the 519th Air Service Group in Italy shortly before the end of World War II in early 1945 as part of a reorganization of Army Air Forces (AAF) support groups in which the AAF replaced service groups that included personnel from other branches of the Army and supported two combat groups with air service groups including only Air Corps units. Designed to support a single combat group, Its 945th Air Engineering Squadron provided maintenance that was beyond the capability of the combat group, its 769th Air Materiel Squadron handled all supply matters, and its Headquarters & Base Services Squadron provided other support. It supported the 485th Bombardment Group in Italy. The group returned to the US, where it continued to support heavy bombardment groups. The group was scheduled to move overseas in 1946, but its movement was cancelled. It was reduced to nominal strength of 4 officers and 7 enlisted men in March 1946, but re-manned in April. The group deployed to Alaska with the 97th Bombardment Group. It was replaced by 97th Airdrome Group, 97th Maintenance & Supply Group, and 97th Station Medical Group as part of the Air Force Wing/Base reorganization (Hobson Plan) in 1947, which was designed to unify control at air bases. It was disbanded in 1948.

=== Cold War ===
The 519th was reconstituted, redesignated as an air defense group, and activated at Suffolk County Air Force Base, New York in 1953 with responsibility for air defense of the Northeastern United States. It was assigned the 45th and 75th Fighter-Interceptor Squadrons (FIS), which were already stationed at Suffolk County, flying North American F-86 Sabres as its operational components. The 45th and 75th FIS had been assigned directly to the 4709th Defense Wing. The group replaced the 77th Air Base Squadron as USAF host unit at Suffolk County. It was assigned three squadrons to perform its support responsibilities. Eight days after the group activated, the 331st Fighter-Interceptor Squadron, equipped with a radar equipped and Mighty Mouse rocket armed model of the Sabre was activated and assigned to the group. In May 1953, the 45th FIS moved to Morocco and was reassigned away from the group. Later in 1953, the 75th FIS upgraded to improved radar equipped Sabres.

The 519th was inactivated and replaced by the 52d Fighter Group (Air Defense) as result of Air Defense Command's Project Arrow, which was designed to bring back on the active list the fighter units which had compiled memorable records in the two world wars. The group was disbanded once again in 1984.

== Lineage ==
- Constituted as: 519th Air Service Group

Activated on 20 January 1945
Inactivated 1 December 1947
Disbanded 8 October 1948

- Reconstituted and redesignated as: 519th Air Defense Group on 21 January 1953

Activated on 16 February 1953
Inactivated on 18 August 1955
Disbanded on 27 September 1984

=== Assignments ===
- Unknown, 20 January 1945 – c. May 1945 (Note: Probably assigned to XV Air Force Service Command.)
- 20th Bombardment Wing (later VIII Bomber Command), c. 1945
- Fifteenth Air Force, March 1946 – 1947
- 4709th Defense Wing (later 4709th Air Defense Wing), 16 February 1953 – 18 August 1955

=== Stations ===
- Venosa Airfield, Italy, 20 January 1945 – 8 May 1945
- Capodichino Airport, Naples, Italy, 8 May 1945 – 15 May 1945
- Camp Patrick Henry, Virginia, 24 May 1945 – 24 May 1945
- Sioux City Army Air Base, Iowa, Jul 1945–8 September 1945
- Salina Army Air Field, Kansas, 8 September 1945 – 4 October 1947
- Mile 26 Field, Alaska, 4 October 1947 – 1 December 1947
- Suffolk County Air Force Base, New York, 16 February 1953 – 18 August 1955

=== Components ===
Operational Squadrons

- 45th Fighter-Interceptor Squadron, 16 February 1953 – 28 May 1953
- 75th Fighter-Interceptor Squadron, 16 February 1953 – 18 August 1955
- 331st Fighter-Interceptor Squadron, 24 February 1953 – 18 August 1955

Support Units

- 519th Air Base Squadron, 16 February 1953 – 18 August 1955
- 519th Materiel Squadron, 16 February 1953 – 18 August 1955
- 519th Medical Squadron (later 519th USAF Infirmary), 16 February 1953 – 18 August 1955
- 769th Air Materiel Squadron, 20 January 1945 – 1 December 1947
- 945th Air Engineering Squadron, 20 January 1945 – 1 December 1947

=== Aircraft ===
- North American F-86A Sabre, 1953
- North American F-86F Sabre, 1953
- North American F-86D Sabre, 1953–1955

== See also ==
- List of United States Air Force Aerospace Defense Command Interceptor Squadrons
- List of F-86 Sabre units
