= FMZ =

FMZ may refer to:

- FMZ, the DS100 code for Mainz Hauptbahnhof, Rhineland-Palatinate, Germany
- FMZ, the FAA LID code for Fairmont State Airfield, Nebraska, United States
