= 831st Bombardment Squadron =

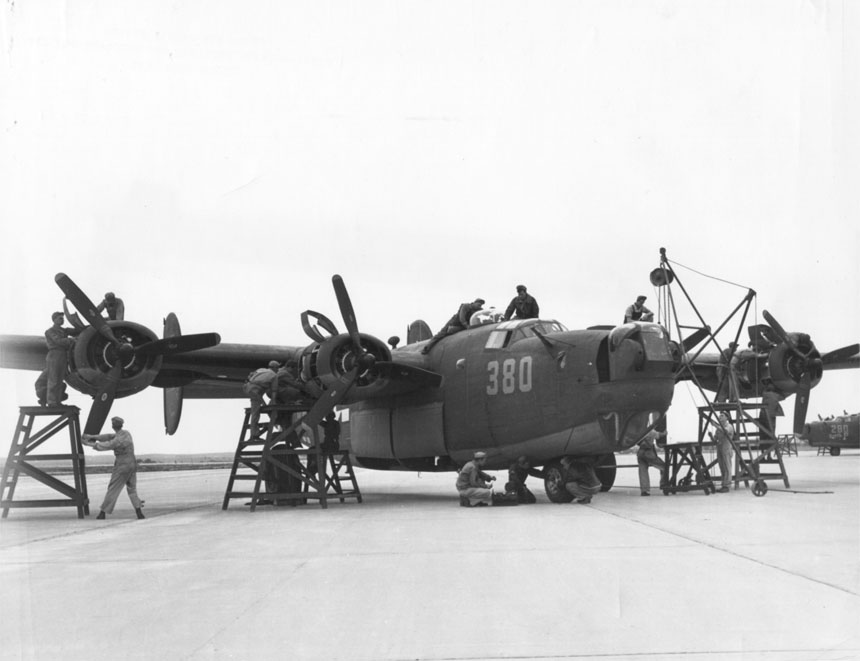
- B-24 Liberator as flown by the 831st Squadron
- Active: 1942-1945
- Country: United States
- Branch: United States Air Force
- Role: Heavy bomber
- Engagements: Mediterranean Theater of Operations
- Decorations: Distinguished Unit Citation

Insignia
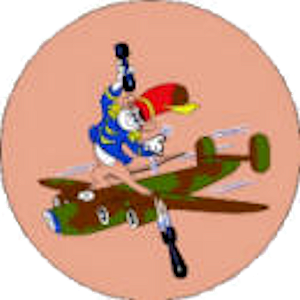
- 831st Bombardment Squadron emblem (Note: This emblem apparently never received official approval. Maurer, Combat Squadrons, pp. 773-774 lists the 11th Antisubmarine Squadron emblem as the official emblem for the 831st. The emblem is included on the 485th Bomb Group Association web page)

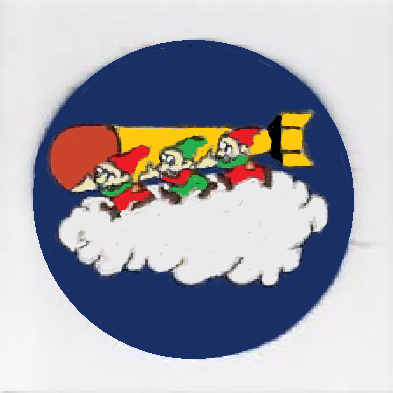
- 11th Antisubmarine Squadron emblem (Note: Approved 9 February 1943. Description: On a blue disc, three dwarfs atired red, green, and red respectively, carrying a large yellow aerial bomb, nose orange fesswise, across a white cloud formation.)

The 831st Bombardment Squadron was a squadron of the United States Army Air Forces. It was activated in 1942 as the 516th Bombardment Squadron and flew antisubmarine missions off the Atlantic coast as the 11th Antisubmarine Squadron. Later, it saw combat in the Mediterranean Theater of Operations as a Consolidated B-24 Liberator unit, where it earned a Distinguished Unit Citation during the strategic bombing campaign against Germany. Following V-E Day, the squadron returned to the United States and was inactivated at Sioux City Army Air Base, Iowa, on 20 August 1945.

== History ==
=== Antisubmarine campaign ===
The squadron was first activated as the 516th Bombardment Squadron on 18 October 1942, when the 377th Bombardment Group replaced the 59th Observation Group at Fort Dix Army Air Field and assumed its mission, personnel and equipment. The 516th was initially equipped with the North American O-47s and Curtiss O-52 Owls of the 9th Observation Squadron, but converted to North American B-25 Mitchells the following year. Although the 516th was located with group headquarters, the other squadrons of the group were at various bases along the coast between Delaware and New Hampshire.

In October 1942, the Army Air Forces organized its antisubmarine forces into the single Army Air Forces Antisubmarine Command, which established the 25th Antisubmarine Wing the following month to control its forces operating over the Atlantic. Its bombardment group headquarters, including the 377th, were inactivated and the squadron, now designated the 11th Antisubmarine Squadron, was assigned directly to the 25th Wing. In July 1943, the AAF and Navy reached an agreement to transfer the coastal antisubmarine mission to the Navy. This mission transfer also included an exchange of AAF long-range bombers equipped for antisubmarine warfare for Navy Consolidated B-24 Liberators without such equipment.

=== Combat in the Mediterranean Theater ===
The squadron was redesignated the 831st Bombardment Squadron on 1 October and moved to Fairmont Army Air Field, where it acted as the cadre for the newly-activated 485th Bombardment Group. It trained with Consolidated B-24 Liberators until March 1944, when it deployed to the Mediterranean Theater of Operations. En route to the theater, on 20 April 1944, 154 members of the Squadron were lost when the Liberty ship SS Paul Hamilton was sunk by an aerial torpedo. The squadron's ground echelon arrived at its base at Venosa Airfield, Italy in April, but when the air echelon arrived in theater, it remained in Tunisia for additional training.

The squadron entered combat in May 1944, and primarily flew long range strategic bombing missions against targets in Italy, France, Germany, Austria, Hungary, Romania, and Yugoslavia, bombing marshalling yards, oil refineries, airfields, heavy industry, and other strategic objectives, such as the Ploesti air raids on the Romanian oilfields. The squadron was awarded a Distinguished Unit Citation for continuing an attack on an oil refinery near Vienna, Austria on 26 June 1944 despite heavy fighter opposition.

The 831st was occasionally diverted from the strategic campaign to carry out some support and interdiction operations. It struck bridges, harbors, and troop concentrations in August 1944 to aid with Operation Dragoon, the invasion of Southern France. It also hit communications lines and other targets during March and April 1945 to support the advance of the British Eighth Army in northern Italy in Operation Grapeshot.

The unit departed Italy in May 1945. In late July, it reassembled at Sioux City Army Air Base, Iowa. The following month, the 485th Group was redesignated as a very heavy group. Because, such groups had only three, rather than four, operational squadrons, the 831st was inactivated on 20 August 1945.

== Lineage ==
- Constituted as the 516th Bombardment Squadron (Heavy) on 13 October 1942

Activated on 18 October 1942
Redesignated 11th Antisubmarine Squadron (Heavy) on 29 November 1942
Redesignated 11th Antisubmarine Squadron (Medium) on 3 March 1943
Redesignated 11th Antisubmarine Squadron (Heavy) on 20 April 1943
Redesignated 831st Bombardment Squadron (Heavy) on 1 October 1943
Redesignated 831st Bombardment Squadron, Heavy c. 1944
Inactivated on 20 August 1945

=== Assignments ===
- 377th Bombardment Group, 18 October 1942
- 25th Antisubmarine Wing, 9 December 1942
- 485th Bombardment Group, 1 October 1943 – 20 August 1945

=== Stations ===
- Fort Dix Army Air Base, New Jersey, 18 October 1942
- Gowen Field, Idaho, 1 October 1943
- Fairmont Army Air Field, Nebraska, 20 September 1943 – 11 March 1944
- Venosa Airfield, Italy, c. 30 April 1944 – c. 9 May 1945
- Sioux City Army Air Base, Iowa, 24 July 1945
- Smoky Hill Army Air Field, Kansas, 8 September 1945 – 20 August 1945

=== Aircraft ===
- North American O-47, 1942–1943
- Curtiss O-52 Owl, 1942–1943
- North American B-25 Mitchell, 1943
- Consolidated B-24 Liberator, 1943-1945

=== Awards and campaigns ===
Award streamer	Award	Dates	Notes
	Distinguished Unit Citation	26 June 1944	Vienna Austria 831st Bombardment Squadron

Campaign Streamer	Campaign	Dates	Notes
	Antisubmarine	18 October 1942 – 1 August 1943	516th Bombardment Squadron (later 11th Antisubmarine Squadron)
	Air Offensive, Europe	c. 9 May 1944 – 5 June 1944	831st Bombardment Squadron
	Air Combat, EAME Theater	c. 9 May 1944 – 11 May 1945	831st Bombardment Squadron
	Central Europe	c. 9 May 1944 – 21 May 1945	831st Bombardment Squadron
	Rome-Arno	c. 9 May 1944 – 9 September 1944	831st Bombardment Squadron
	Normandy	6 June 1944 – 24 July 1944	831st Bombardment Squadron
	Northern France	25 July 1944 – 14 September 1944	831st Bombardment Squadron
	Southern France	15 August 1944 – 14 September 1944	831st Bombardment Squadron
	North Apennines	10 September 1944 – 4 April 1945	831st Bombardment Squadron
	Rhineland	15 September 1944 – 21 March 1945	831st Bombardment Squadron
	Po Valley	3 April 1945 – 8 May 1945	831st Bombardment Squadron

== See also ==
- B-24 Liberator units of the United States Army Air Forces
