= SS Paul Hamilton =

World War II Liberty ship of the United States

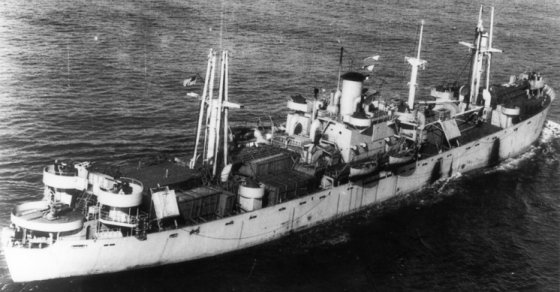
- SS Paul Hamilton

History

United States
- Laid down: 30 August 1942
- Launched: 20 October 1942
- Fate: Lost off Algiers 20 April 1944

General characteristics
- Tonnage: 7,176 GRT
- Displacement: 14,245 tons
- Length: 441 ft 6 in (134.57 m)
- Beam: 56 ft 10.75 in (17.3419 m)
- Draft: 27 ft 9.25 in (8.4646 m)
- Propulsion: Two oil-fired boilers, triple-expansion steam engine, single screw, 2500 horsepower (1.9 MW)
- Speed: 11 to 11.5 knots (20 to 21 km/h)
- Range: 23,000 miles (37,000 km)
- Capacity: 9,140 tons cargo
- Complement: 41
- Armament: Stern-mounted 4 in (102 mm) deck gun for use against surfaced submarines, variety of anti-aircraft guns.

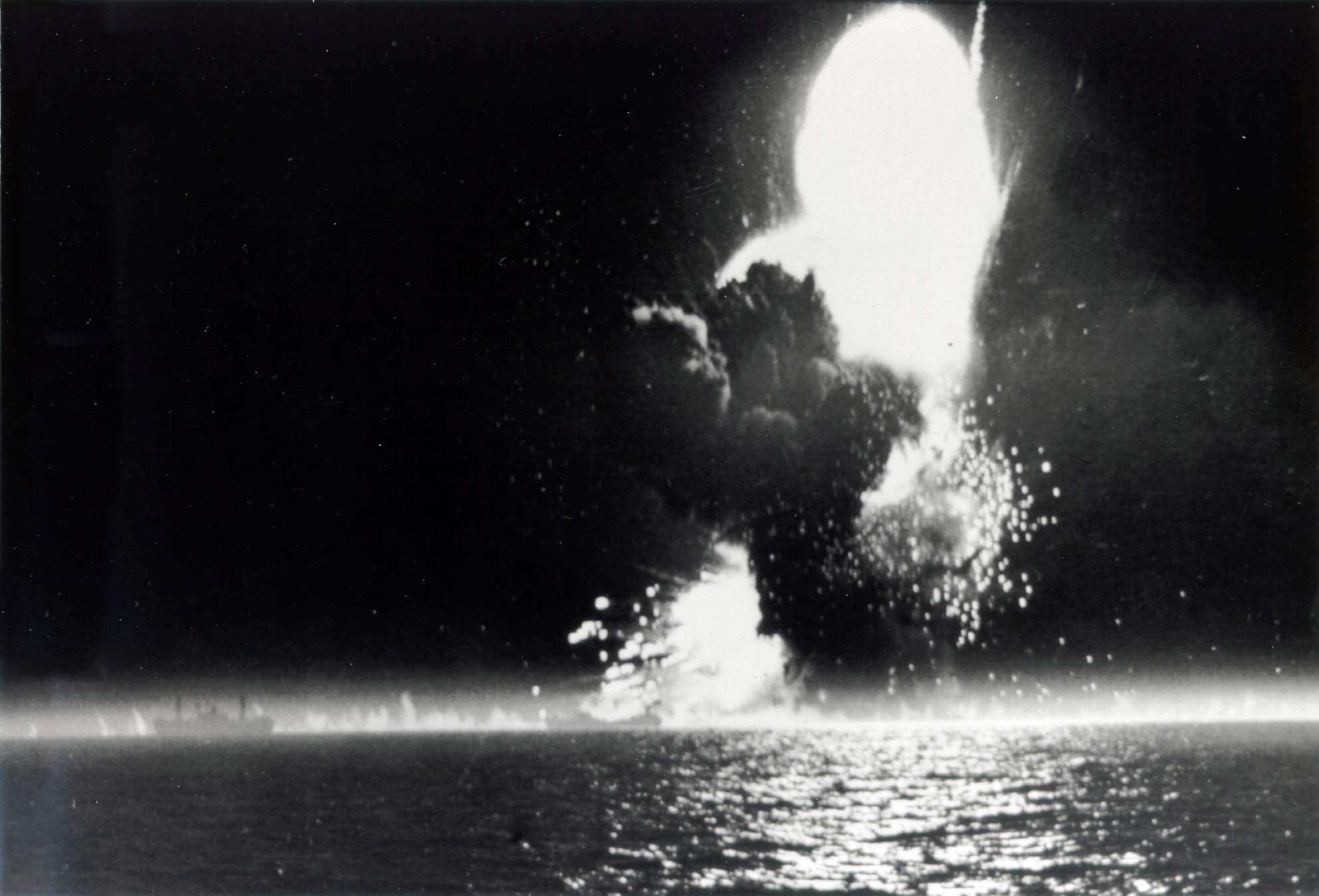
The explosion of SS Paul Hamilton on 20 April 1944.

SS Paul Hamilton (Hull Number 227) was a Liberty ship built in the United States during World War II. She was named after Paul Hamilton, the third United States Secretary of the Navy. She was operated by the Black Diamond Steamship Company under charter with the Maritime Commission and War Shipping Administration.

On her fifth voyage the SS Paul Hamilton left Hampton Roads, Virginia on 2 April 1944 as part of convoy UGS 38, carrying supplies and the ground personnel of the 485th Bombardment Group of the United States Army Air Forces to Italy. On the evening of 20 April it was attacked 30 miles (48 km) off the coast of Cape Bengut near Algiers in the Mediterranean Sea by 23 German Ju 88 bombers of III./Kampfgeschwader 26, I. and III./Kampfgeschwader 77. One aerial torpedo struck the Paul Hamilton and detonated the cargo of high explosives and bombs. The crew and passengers, who included 154 officers and men of the 831st Bombardment Squadron and 317 officers and men of the 32nd Photo Reconnaissance Squadron, were all lost. Of the 580 men aboard only one body was recovered.
