= 506th Bombardment Squadron =

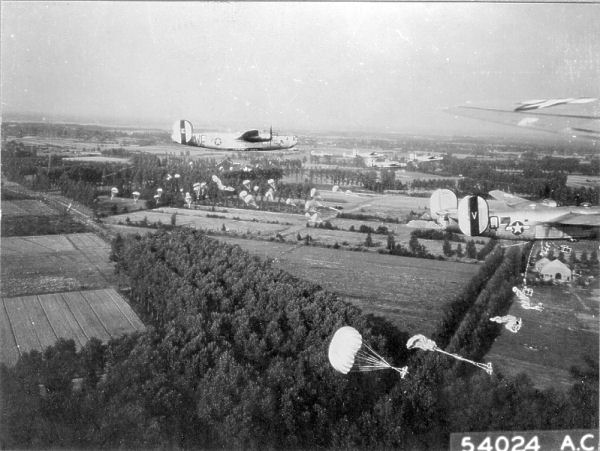
- 44th Group B-24 Liberators on a parachute drop mission
- Active: 1942–1946; 1958–1960
- Country: United States
- Branch: United States Air Force
- Role: bombardment
- Engagements: European Theater of Operations
- Decorations: Distinguished Unit Citation

Insignia
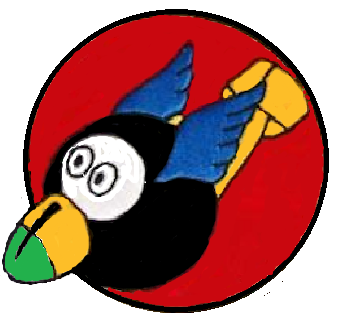
- 506th Bombardment Squadron emblem (World War II)
- Fuselage code: GJ

The 506th Bombardment Squadron is an inactive United States Air Force unit. It was last assigned to the 44th Bombardment Wing at Chennault Air Force Base, Louisiana, where it was inactivated on 15 June 1960.

The squadron was first activated in 1942 as a replacement unit to fill out the 44th Bombardment Group. After training in the United States. it joined its parent group in the European Theater of Operations. The squadron flew combat missions in the strategic bombing campaign against Germany until the end of the air war in Europe, earning two Distinguished Unit Citations. It returned to the United States and began training with Boeing B-29 Superfortress bombers, but was inactivated in August 1946.

The squadron was reactivated in 1958, when Strategic Air Command expanded its Boeing B-47 Stratojet wings from three to four squadrons.

== History ==
=== World War II ===
==== Background and training ====
In August 1942, the 44th Bombardment Group, which was the first Army Air Forces unit to equip with the Consolidated B-24 Liberator, began to deploy to England. However, the previous month, the group's 404th Bombardment Squadron had moved to Alaska to reinforce Eleventh Air Force, and the 44th Group moved to England with only three squadrons assigned. In September 1942, the 404th Squadron's assignment to Alaska became permanent and the AAF activated the 506th Bombardment Squadron at Salt Lake City Army Air Base, Utah as its replacement.

The squadron trained with B-24s at Pueblo Army Air Base, Colorado and Wendover Field, Utah under the supervision of the 308th Bombardment Group until January 1943. The following month, it departed the United States to join its parent group at RAF Shipdham.

==== Combat in Europe ====
The squadron arrived at its combat station, on 17 March 1943. Its initial operations were against strategic targets in Western Europe and included airfields, harbors, industrial targets, shipyards and submarine pens in France and Germany. On 14 May 1943, it engaged in a hazardous mission against Kiel. The operation called for an initial attack by three Boeing B-17 Flying Fortress groups which would drop high explosive bombs. The 506th and other squadrons of the 44th Group would then attack with incendiaries. Because the group was acting alone, it was deprived of the defensive fire of the B-17s. Its vulnerability was increased when it opened its formation preparing to drop its bombs. Despite continuous interceptor attacks and heavy flak, the unit successfully struck the target. The squadron was awarded its first Distinguished Unit Citation (DUC) for this action. This award to group headquarters and three of the 44th's squadrons, was the first made to an Eighth Air Force bomber unit.

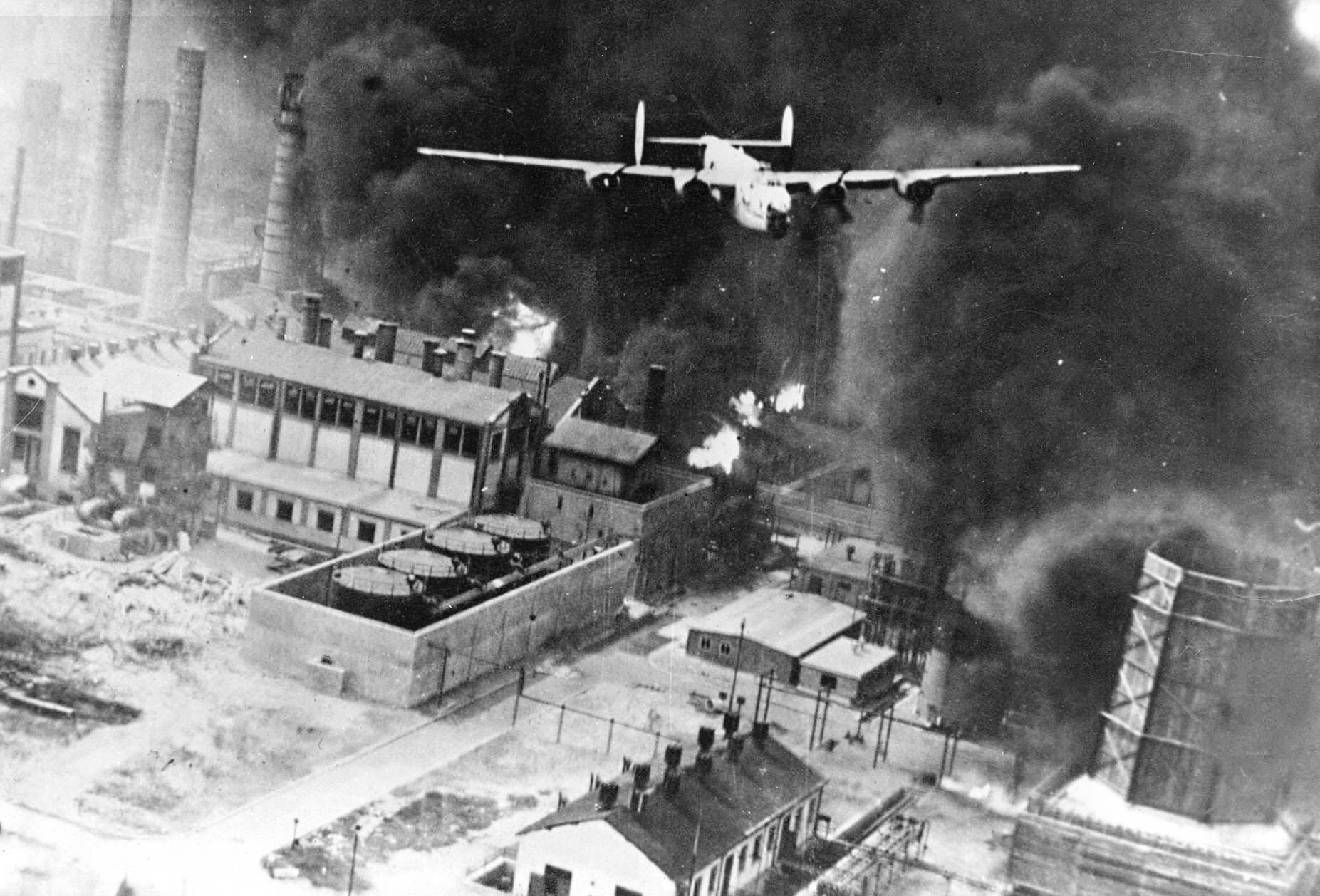
44th Group Liberator on Operation Tidal Wave

In late June 1943, a large detachment of the squadron moved to Soluch Airfield, Libya, ostensibly to assist in Operation Husky, the invasion of Sicily, by attacking airfields and marshalling yards in Italy. However, prior to deploying to Africa, the squadron had engaged in extensive low level training in England, and the Norden bombsights in its planes had been replaced by a simpler sight. While deployed, this element participated in Operation Tidal Wave, the noted low level raid on the oil refineries near Ploesti, Romania on 1 August. The squadron attacked its assigned target through heavy smoke left behind when the 93d Bombardment Group attacked the target assigned to the 44th Group in error, which alerted enemy air defenses that strongly defended the target. The squadron earned its second DUC for this action. Before leaving North Africa, the squadron also bombed the Messerschmitt aircraft factory in Wiener Neustadt, Austria and provided close air support for ground forces in Sicily. The detachment returned to England at the beginning of September, but another detachment was deployed to support Operation Avalanche, the invasion of Italy with landings at Salerno, remaining until early October.

The squadron concentrated on striking strategic targets, concentrating on airfields, oil facilities and rail transportation hubs. From 20 to 25 February 1944, it participated in the Big Week attacks on the German aircraft industry. It was occasionally diverted to attack tactical targets. In preparation for Operation Overlord, the invasion of Normandy, it participated in Operation Crossbow, attacks on V Weapons sites and also bombed transportation targets near the beaches. It continued these attacks and attacked coastal defenses during the month of June 1944. It supported Operation Cobra, the breakout at Saint Lo, and operations in the Battle for Caen. In September it airdropped supplies to airborne forces engaged in Operation Market Garden, the attempt to establish a bridgehead across the Rhine in the Netherlands. It also flew missions to check enemy advances during the Battle of the Bulge by striking communications and transportation targets. The 506th flew resupply missions during Operation Varsity airborne assault across the Rhine. The squadron flew its last combat mission on 25 April 1945.

=== Strategic Air Command ===
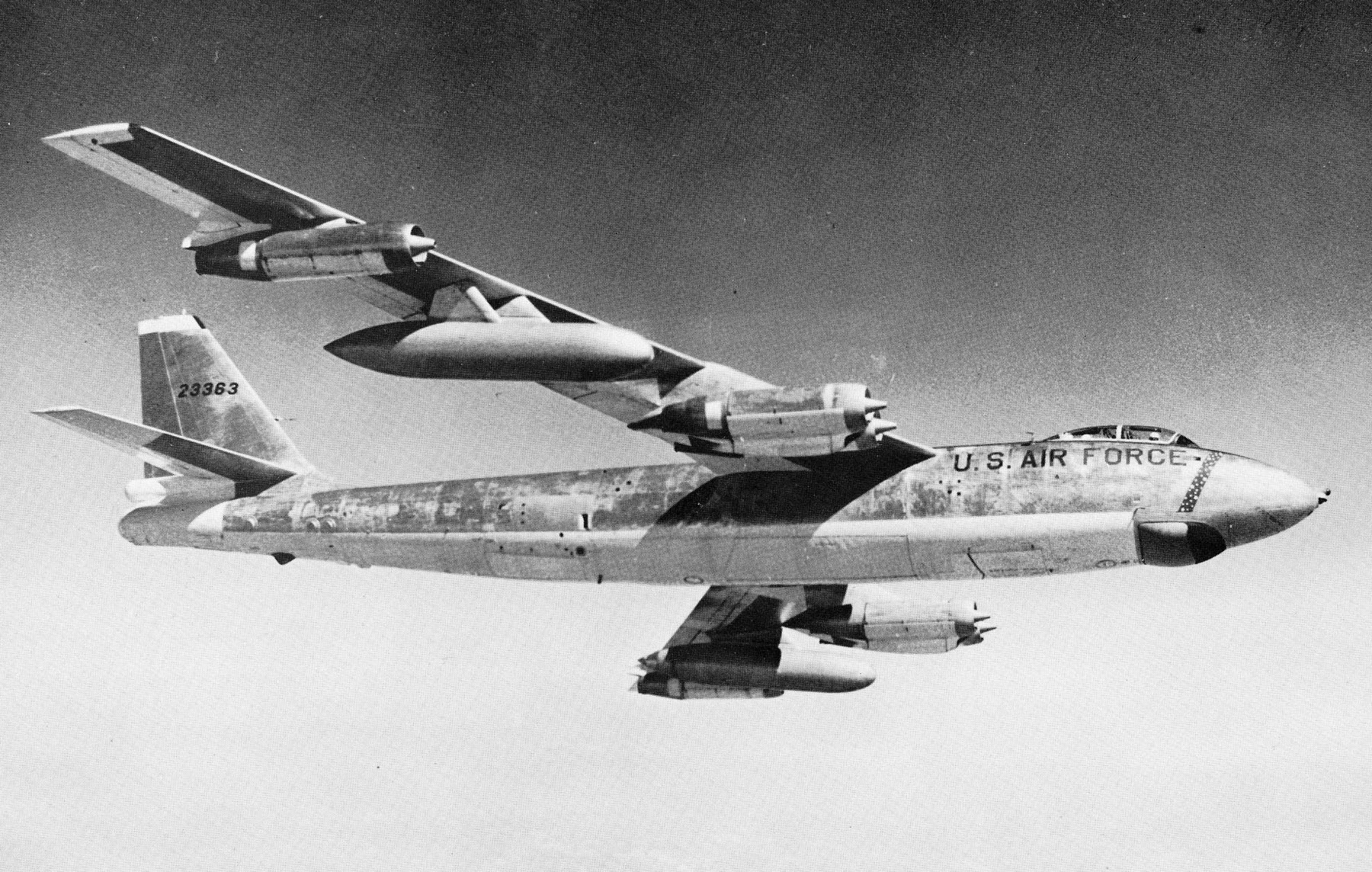
B47E in flight

Following V-E Day, the squadron returned to the United States, with the first planes leaving on 22 May 1945. The ground echelon sailed on the RMS Queen Mary on 15 June. In July, the group began training at Great Bend Army Air Field, Kansas as a Boeing B-29 Superfortress unit. In March 1946, the squadron was reassigned to 485th Bombardment Group, becoming one of the original combat elements of Strategic Air Command (SAC). In August 1946, the squadron was inactivated along with the 485th Group, and transferred its personnel and equipment to the 340th Bombardment Squadron of the 97th Bombardment Group.

From 1958, the Boeing B-47 Stratojet wings of SAC began to assume an alert posture at their home bases, reducing the amount of time spent on alert at overseas bases. The SAC alert cycle divided itself into four parts: planning, flying, alert and rest to meet General Thomas S. Power’s initial goal of maintaining one third of SAC’s planes on fifteen minute ground alert, fully fueled and ready for combat to reduce vulnerability to a Soviet missile strike. To implement this new system B-47 wings reorganized from three to four squadrons. The 506th was activated at Lake Charles Air Force Base as the fourth squadron of the 44th Bombardment Wing. The squadron was discontinued when the 44th Wing was inactivated on 15 June 1960.

== Lineage ==
- Constituted as the 506th Bombardment Squadron (Heavy) on 24 September 1942

Activated on 1 October 1942
Redesignated 506th Bombardment Squadron, Heavy on 20 August 1943
Redesignated 506th Bombardment Squadron, Very Heavy on 5 August 1945
Inactivated on 4 August 1946

- Redesignated 506th Bombardment Squadron, Medium on 20 August 1958

Activated on 1 December 1958
Discontinued on 15 June 1960

=== Assignments ===
- 44th Bombardment Group, 1 October 1942 (attached to 308th Bombardment Group for training, 1 October 1942 – c. 16 January 1943)
- 485th Bombardment Group, 7 March – 4 August 1946
- 44th Bombardment Wing, 1 December 1958 – 15 June 1960 (Note: Technically, because the squadron was "discontinued" and not "inactivated" it remained active and assigned to Headquarters, USAF. Maurer, Combat Squadrons, pp. 608–609. The Air Force removed the distinction between "discontinued" and "inactivated" units in 1969.)

=== Stations ===
- Salt Lake City Army Air Base, Utah, 1 October 1942 (Note: Maurer gives 1 November for this assignment in an apparent typographical error. Maurer, Combat Squadrons, p. 608.)
- Pueblo Army Air Base, Colorado, 1 October 1942
- Wendover Field, Utah, 29 October 1942
- Pueblo Army Air Base, Colorado, c. 20 November 1942 – 7 February 1943
- RAF Shipdham, England, 17 March 1943 – c. 15 June 1945 (detachments operated from Soluch Airfield, Libya, c. 27 June – c. 1 September 1943 and from Tunis, Tunisia, c. 19 September – c. 9 October 1943)
- Sioux Falls Army Air Field, South Dakota, 26 June 1945
- Great Bend Army Air Field, Kansas, 25 July 1945
- Smoky Hill Army Air Field, Kansas, 14 December 1945 – 4 August 1946
- Lake Charles Air Force Base (later Chennault Air Force Base), Louisiana, 1 December 1958 – 15 June 1960

=== Aircraft ===
- Consolidated B-24 Liberator, 1942–1945
- Boeing B-29 Superfortress, 1945–1946
- Boeing B-47 Stratojet, 1958–1960

=== Awards and campaigns ===
Award streamer	Award	Dates	Notes
	Distinguished Unit Citation	14 May 1943	Kiel
	Distinguished Unit Citation	1 August 1943	Ploesti

Campaign Streamer	Campaign	Dates	Notes
	Air Offensive, Europe	17 March 1943 – 5 June 1944	
	Air Combat, EAME Theater	17 March 1943 – 11 May 1945	
	Sicily	27 June 1943 – 17 August 1943	
	Naples-Foggia	18 August 1943 – 21 January 1944	
	Normandy	6 June 1944 – 24 July 1944	
	Northern France	25 July 1944 – 14 September 1944	
	Rhineland	15 September 1944 – 21 March 1945	
	Ardennes-Alsace	16 December 1944 – 25 January 1945	
	Central Europe	22 March 1944 – 21 May 1945	

== See also ==
- B-24 Liberator units of the United States Army Air Forces
- List of B-29 Superfortress operators
- List of B-47 units of the United States Air Force
