= 45th Fighter Squadron =

US Air Force Reserve unit

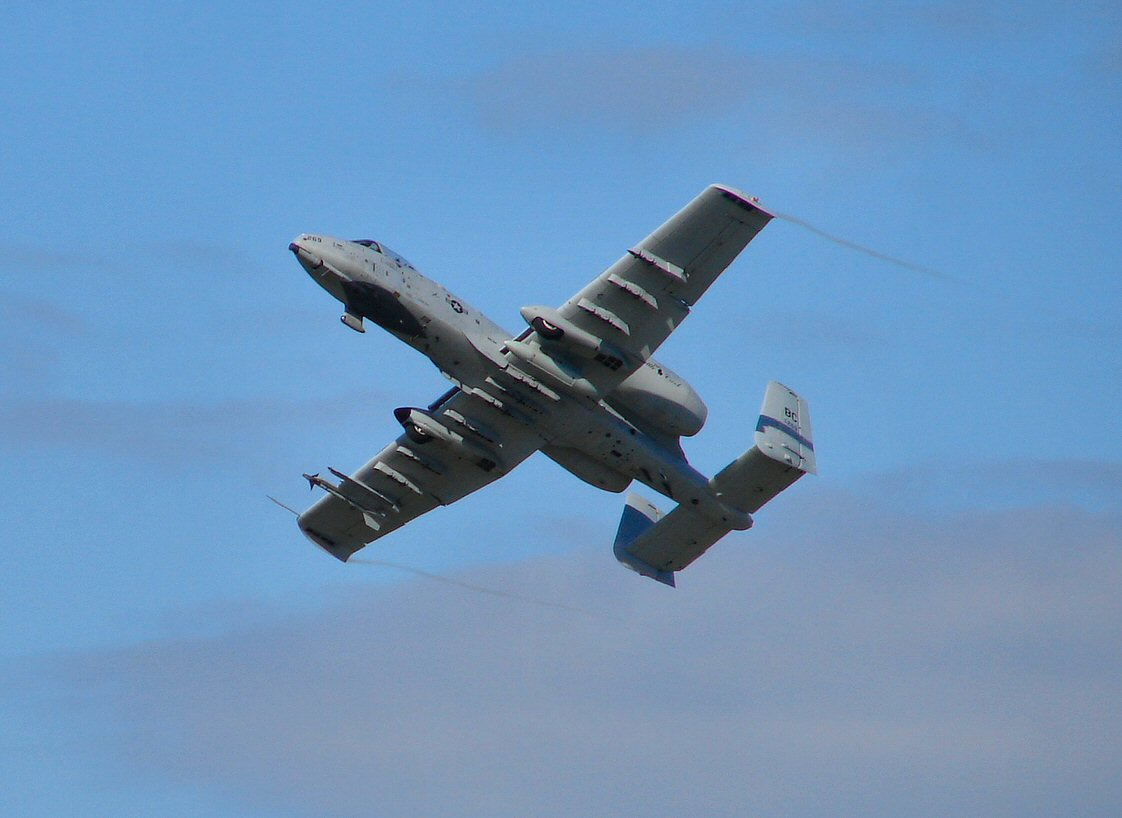
- A-10 Thunderbolt II
- Active: 1940–1946; 1952–1958; 1962–1971; 1973–1994; 2009–present
- Country: United States
- Branch: United States Air Force
- Role: Fighter
- Part of: Air Combat Command
- Garrison/HQ: Davis–Monthan Air Force Base
- Nickname(s): Hoosier Hogs
- Engagements: World War II; Pearl Harbor; Iwo Jima; Vietnam War
- Decorations: Distinguished Unit Citation; Air Force Outstanding Unit Award

Insignia
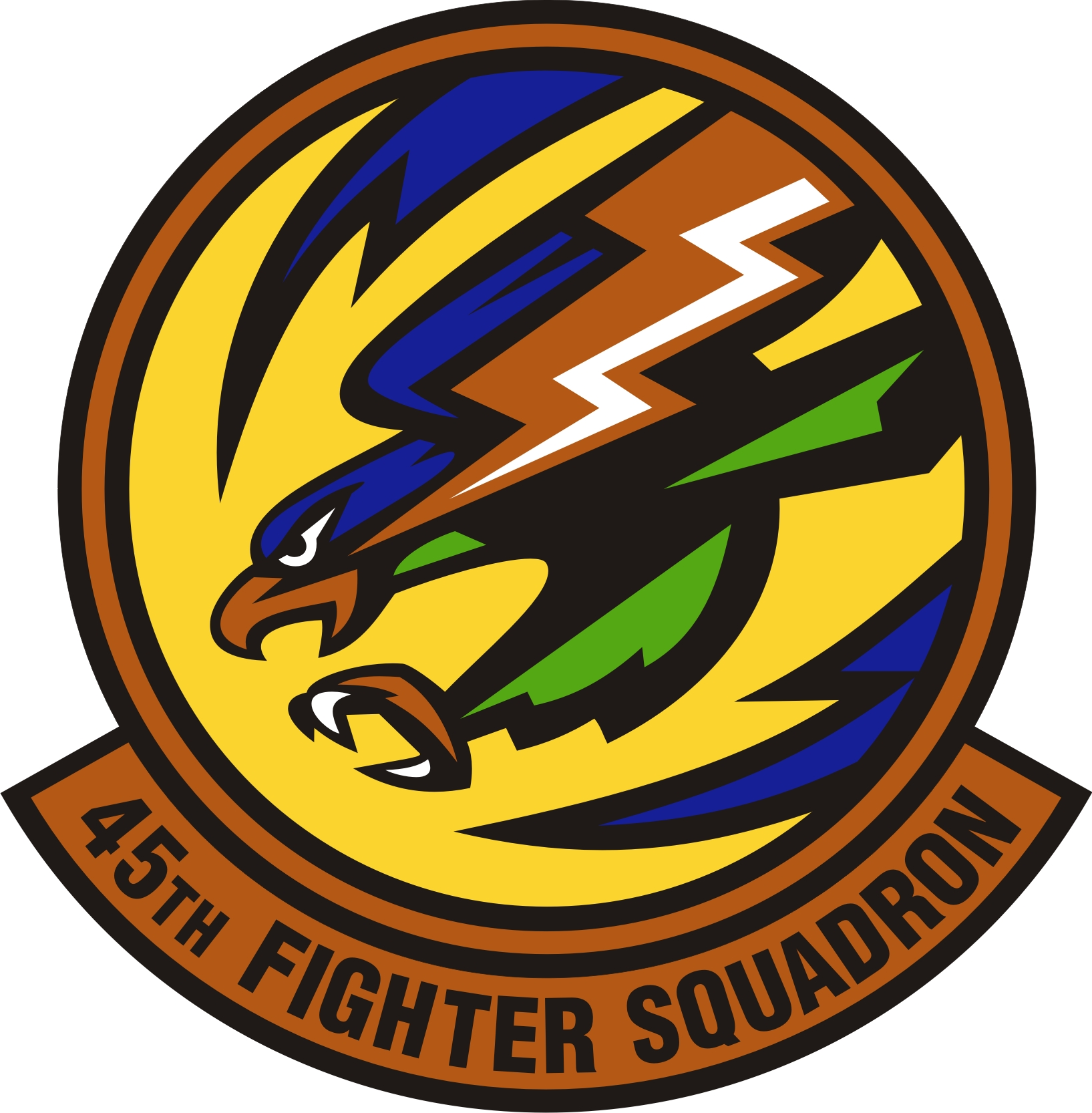
- 45th Fighter Sq emblem (approved 19 March 2010)

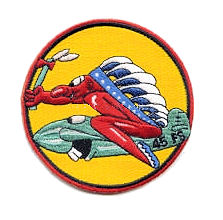
- 45th Fighter Squadron emblem (approved 24 August 1944)

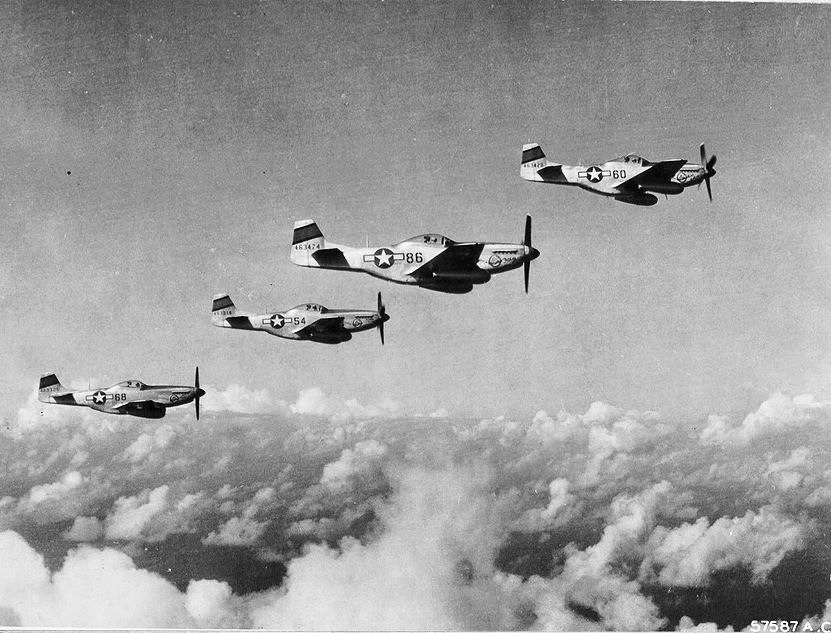
North American P-51D-20-NA Mustangs from the 45th Fighter Squadron, 15th Fighter Group flying an escort mission from Central Field, Iwo Jima, June 1945. AAF Serial Numbers 44-63325, 44-63314, 44-63474, 44-63428

The 45th Fighter Squadron is a United States Air Force Reserve unit. It is assigned to the Air Force Reserve Command's (AFRC) 924th Fighter Group and stationed at Davis–Monthan Air Force Base, Arizona. The squadron currently flies the Fairchild Republic A-10 Thunderbolt II.

== Mission ==
The squadron trains A-10 Thunderbolt II pilots, operating and maintaining the aircraft of the 355th Fighter Wing, the regular A-10 unit at Davis Monthan. The A-10 formal training includes initial qualification in the airplane, transition training, instructor pilot upgrade training and a senior officer course.

== History ==
=== World War II ===
The history of the 45th Fighter Squadron goes back to 22 November 1940, when the War Department constituted the 45th Pursuit Squadron (Fighter). The unit was activated at Wheeler Field, Hawaii on 1 December 1940, where it served as part of the 15th Pursuit Group in defense of Hawaii.

When the Japanese launched their surprise attack on Pearl Harbor on 7 December 1941, the 45th suffered heavy losses, as did the other squadrons in the 15th Group. Two-thirds of the Curtiss P-36 Hawk and Curtiss P-40 Warhawk aircraft at Wheeler Field were destroyed on the ground. Earlier, the planes had been stripped of ammunition and fuel, and taken out of their protective earthen revetments because of potential for sabotage in these protected but difficult-to-see areas. Parked in the open, the planes were easy targets for the Japanese pilots as they strafed and bombed the field.

Everyone on the ground scrambled for cover as the field was being hit, while at the same time pilots were trying to get their planes off the ground without too much success. However, Lieutenants George Welch and Kenneth Taylor, two pilots from the 47th Pursuit Squadron whose planes were at Haleiwa Field at the time, were able to get their Curtis P-40B Tomahawks into the air soon after the attack began. Although outnumbered, they still managed to shoot down six Japanese planes.

Meanwhile, Captain Aaron Tyler, commander of the 45th at Wheeler, ordered his crews to pull out all the undamaged planes they could find and have them fueled and armed. Less than a dozen aircraft were available, but the pilots who were selected to fly wasted no time boarding their planes. They quickly took off, hoping to tangle with the Japanese fighters. After searching the area for almost an hour, all they saw as they flew over Pearl Harbor were the burning ships and immense damage. By this time, the Japanese planes were long gone, having already headed back to their carrier at sea.

In the days following the attack on Pearl Harbor, the pilots and ground personnel of the 45th had the job of cleaning up the mess at Wheeler Field. Among the first things they did was put the remaining aircraft back into their revetments. After moving their flight operations to different fields in Hawaii, the 45th was back in the air conducting daily air defense patrols over the islands. These long flights put a heavy toll on the P-36s and P-40Bs that the pilots flew, so they requested new aircraft. The pilots soon received new Curtiss P-40E Warhawk and the tricycle-gear Bell P-39 Airacobra.

On 12 February 1942, the squadron was redesignated the 45th Pursuit Squadron (Interceptor). Although the 45th still had as its primary mission the conducting of aerial patrols, it was also given the duties of conducting combat training for pilots. Three months later, on 15 May 1942, the term "pursuit" was dropped and the squadron was redesignated the 45th Fighter Squadron. Over the next two years, the squadron would be involved primarily with combat training, and the job of air defense would take on a secondary role.

The 45th was sent to the Central Pacific in 1943 for combat operations against Japanese forces. Then, on 6 April 1944, the squadron returned to Mokuleia Field, Hawaii, and began training for very-long-range (VLR) bomber escort missions. By this time, the pilots in the squadron were flying Republic P-47 Thunderbolts. Later in the year they would acquire the longer range North American P-51 Mustangs.

In January 1945, the 45th was ordered into combat, along with the other assigned squadrons in the 15th group. It left Hawaii for Saipan in the Marianas Islands, staying there until the Marines on Iwo Jima could secure a landing strip.

The first squadron to arrive at Iwo Jima was the 47th Fighter Squadron on the morning of 6 March, with the 45th landing the next day. They supported Marine ground units by bombing and strafing cave entrances, trenches, troop concentrations, and storage areas. Before the month was over, the 45th began strikes against enemy airfields, shipping and military installations in the Bonin Islands.

Flying its first VLR mission to Japan on 7 April 1945, the 45th provided fighter escort for the Boeing B-29 Superfortresses that attacked the Nakajima aircraft plant near Tokyo. In late April and early May that year, the 45th struck airfields on the Japanese home island of Kyushu to hold back the enemy's Kamikaze attacks against the American invasion force on Okinawa. The squadron also attacked enemy troop trains, small factories, gun positions, and hangars in the Bonin Islands and Japan.

During the summer of 1945, the 45th was assigned to the Twentieth Air Force and continued its fighter sweeps against Japanese airfields and other tactical targets. It continued to fly long-range B-29 escort missions to Japanese cities until the end of the war. After the Japanese surrender, the squadron remained on Iwo Jima until 25 November 1945, when it transferred to Bellows Field, Hawaii. On 8 February 1946, the squadron moved to Wheeler Field, where it stayed until inactivated on 15 October 1946.

=== Air Defense Command ===
The squadron was redesignated the 45th Fighter-Interceptor Squadron and was activated on 1 November 1952 at Suffolk County Air Force Base, New York and assigned to the 4709th Defense Wing of the Air Defense Command (ADC). It assumed the mission, personnel and North American F-86 Sabres of the 118th Fighter-Interceptor Squadron, which had been called to active duty for the Korean War. The 118th was returned to the control of the Connecticut Air National Guard. In February 1953 Air Defense Command reorganized its dispersed fighter bases and the 45th was assigned to the 519th Air Defense Group, which was activated to control operational and support elements at Suffolk County. Its primary mission was in defending the American east coast from any Soviet threats.

=== North Africa ===
The squadron had a short ADC commitment, however, as they were transferred to United States Air Forces Europe (USAFE) in French Morocco, North Africa. On 25 May 1953, the squadron left Suffolk County and flew all their aircraft over to Sidi Slimane Air Base, which was a Strategic Air Command (SAC) base. Making stops along the way, the squadron arrived at Sidi Slimane on 28 May. The base was shared with rotating bomber groups that flew Boeing B-47 Stratojet medium-range bombers.

Now part of the Seventeenth Air Force, the squadron was attached to the Air Defense Division, Provisional on 8 June 1953. A short time later, on 18 September 1953, they were assigned to the 316th Air Division. The primary mission of the 45th at Sidi Slimane was flying air defense patrols off the coast of Morocco and around the Atlas mountains to the east. Pilots also took turns on alert duty in case an unidentified aircraft was spotted on radar coming towards French Morocco.

The squadron was redesignated 45th Fighter-Day Squadron on 8 October 1954. The pilots in the 45th continued to fly the F-86F Sabre until March 1956, when they received new North American F-100C Super Sabres. Defense patrols were still carried out by the 45th until the end of December 1957. On 8 January 1958, the squadron was inactivated again.

=== Tactical Air Command ===
On 17 April 1962, the squadron was redesignated 45th Tactical Fighter Squadron. It organized on 8 May at MacDill Air Force Base, Florida, a former Strategic Air Command base now under Tactical Air Command (TAC), and was assigned to the 12th Tactical Fighter Wing. It was transferred to the 15th Tactical Fighter Wing at MacDill on 1 July 1962. The 45th flew Republic F-84F Thunderstreaks for two years while at MacDill, then in 1964 received McDonnell F-4 Phantom IIs. The mission of the squadron was conducting combat crew training, and they took part in many exercises, flight operations, and readiness tests. During the Cuban Missile Crisis in October 1962, the squadron temporarily reorganized as a combat-capable unit ready to strike Cuba if necessary. After the crisis was over, the squadron returned to its training mission.

In 1965, the 45th was sent from their home base at MacDill to Southeast Asia. Under the command of Colonel William A. Alden, they arrived at Ubon Royal Thai Air Force Base in Thailand on 4 April. The 45th was the first F-4 Phantom II unit to arrive in Southeast Asia. It achieved another first a little over three months later, when on 10 July 1965, two F-4C Phantoms from the 45th shot down two North Vietnamese MiG-17s. This was the first United States Air Force aerial victory of the Vietnam War. Captain Thomas Roberts was the pilot of one of the F-4s, and Captain Ronald Anderson was his backseat weapon systems officer (WSO). Captain Kenneth Holcombe with Captain Arthur Clark as WSO piloted the other F-4.

The 45th left Ubon on 10 August 1965, and returned to MacDill. For the next five years they would serve as a replacement training unit for F-4 pilots headed to SEA. On 1 October 1970, the 15th Tactical Fighter Wing was inactivated and the 1st Tactical Fighter Wing, which was formerly at Hamilton Air Force Base in California, took its place at MacDill. The 45th was assigned to the 1st Wing and continued its role as a training unit until it was inactivated on 1 July 1971.

=== Air Force Reserve ===
On 1 October 1973, the 45th Tactical Fighter Squadron was reactivated and assigned to the Air Force Reserve's (AFRES) 434th Tactical Fighter Wing at Grissom Air Force Base, Indiana. For the next eight years they would fly the Cessna A-37 Dragonfly, an upgraded version of the Cessna T-37 Tweet jet trainer with more performance and armament capabilities.

In 1981 the squadron transitioned to the Fairchild Republic A-10 Thunderbolt II, affectionately called the "Warthog" by those who flew it. On 1 July 1987, the squadron was reassigned to the 930th Tactical Fighter Group at Grissom, which became the 930th Operations Group. As an Air Force Reserve unit, the 940 TFG still flew the A-10. On 1 February 1992, the squadron was redesignated 45th Fighter Squadron. Known as the "Hoosier Hogs," the pilots of the 45th flew their missions up until September 1994. The squadron was inactivated on 1 October 1994.

On 1 November 2009, the unit was reactivated as an Air Force Reserve Command A-10 unit at Davis–Monthan Air Force Base, Arizona. The 45th is an associate of the regular 355th Fighter Wing at Davis–Monthan, where it trains A-10 pilots.

== Lineage ==
- Constituted as the 45th Pursuit Squadron (Fighter) on 22 November 1940

Activated on 1 December 1940
Redesignated 45th Pursuit Squadron (Interceptor) on 12 February 1942
Redesignated 45th Fighter Squadron (Single Engine) on 15 May 1942
Inactivated on 15 October 1946

- Redesignated 45th Fighter-Interceptor Squadron on 11 September 1952

Activated on 1 November 1952
Redesignated 45th Fighter-Day Squadron on 8 October 1954
Inactivated on 8 January 1958

- Redesignated 45th Tactical Fighter Squadron and activated on 17 April 1962 (not organized)

Organized on 8 May 1962
Inactivated on 1 July 1971

- Activated 1 October 1973

Redesignated 45th Fighter Squadron on 1 February 1992
Inactivated on 1 October 1994

- Activated on 1 November 2009

=== Assignments ===
- 15th Pursuit Group (later Fighter Group), 1 December 1940 – 15 October 1946
- 4709th Air Defense Wing, 1 November 1952
- 519th Air Defense Group, 16 February 1953
- Seventeenth Air Force, 1 June 1953 (attached to Air Defense Division, Provisional after 8 June 1953)
- 316th Air Division, 18 September 1953 – 8 January 1958
- Tactical Air Command, 1 April 1962 (not organized)
- 12th Tactical Fighter Wing, 8 May – 1 July 1962
- 15th Tactical Fighter Wing, 1 July 1962 – 1 October 1970

Attached to 12th Tactical Fighter Wing, April 1965 – August 1965

- 1st Tactical Fighter Wing, 1 October 1970 – 1 July 1971
- 434th Tactical Fighter Wing, 1 October 1973 – 1 July 1987
- 930th Tactical Fighter Group (later 930th Operations Group), 1 July 1987 – 30 September 1994
- 917th Wing, 1 November 2009
- 924th Fighter Group, 1 January 2011 – present

=== Stations ===
- Wheeler Field, Hawaii Territory, 1 December 1940
- Haleiwa Fighter Strip, Hawaii Territory, 21 December 1941
- Mokuleia Army Airfield, Hawaii Territory, 27 December 1941
- Hilo Army Airfield, Hawaii Territory, 20 October 1942
- Stanley Army Airfield, Hawaii Territory, 20 December 1942
- Bellows Field, Hawaii Territory, 14 August 1943
- Baker Island, 1 September 1943
- Funafuti Airfield, Nanumea, Gilbert Islands, 28 November 1943
- Abemama Airfield, Abemama, Gilbert Islands, 4 January 1944

Operated from: Makin Airfield, Makin, Gilbert Islands, 15 January – 24 March 1944

- Mokuleia Army Airfield, Hawaii Territory, 6 April 1944
- Bellows Field, Hawaii Territory, 19 June 1944 – 5 February 1945
- South Field (Iwo Jima), Iwo Jima, 7 March 1945
- Bellows Field, Hawaii Territory, 25 November 1945
- Wheeler Field, Hawaii Territory, 9 February – 15 October 1946
- Suffolk County Air Force Base, New York, 1 November 1952
- Sidi Slimane Air Base, French Morocco, 28 May 1953 – 8 January 1958
- MacDill Air Force Base, Florida, 8 May 1962 – 1 July 1971 (deployed to Ubon Royal Thai Air Force Base, Thailand, 4 April – 10 August 1965)
- Grissom Air Force Base, Indiana, 1 October 1973 – 30 September 1994
- Davis–Monthan Air Force Base, Arizona, 1 November 2009 – present

=== Aircraft assigned ===
- Boeing P-26 Peashooter, 1940–1941
- Curtis P-36 Hawk, 1941
- Bell P-39 Airacobra, 1942–1944
- Curtis P-40 Warhawk, 1942–1944
- North American P-51 Mustang, 1944–1946
- Republic P-47N Thunderbolt, 1944–1945
- North American F-86F Sabre, 1952–1956
- North American F-100 Super Sabre, 1956–1957
- Republic F-84F Thunderstreak, 1962–1964
- McDonnell F-4 Phantom II, 1964–1970
- Cessna A-37 Dragonfly, 1973–1981
- Fairchild A-10 Thunderbolt II, 1981–1994; 2009–present

== In popular culture ==
In the 2017 film Kong: Skull Island, Lt. Hank Marlow (played by John C. Reilly) was a member of the 45th Pursuit Squadron when he was shot down over Skull Island in 1944.
