= 49th Aviation Squadron =

The 49th Aviation Squadron was an all-Black squadron stationed at Smoky Hill Army Air Field in Salina, Kansas during World War II.

== History ==
The 49th Aviation Squadron (Sep) was activated at Pendleton, Oregon, and assigned to the Second Air Force (Fort George Wright) on 1 July 1942. The unit then transferred to Walla Walla Army Air Base in Washington state on a temporary change of station on 30 August 1942. The unit was re-designated 49th Aviation Squadron (Cld), effective 1 April 1943, upon arrival at Smoky Hill Army Air Field (SHAAF), Salina, Kansas. For a short time, one of the unit's commanding officers was Martin S. Hayden.

One hundred and sixty of the 250 enlisted men in the unit were categorized as Aircraft Handler. This means they did not fly, but were responsible for ferrying, tugging, or moving the aircraft on base. Other members of the unit were trained as aircraft mechanics and electricians. An online article states that the unit became the Aviation Detachment of the 376th Air Base Headquarters and Base Squadron. However, the Air Force Historical Research Agency was not able to confirm that change with documentation. Per AFHRA records, the 49th Aviation Squadron was disbanded effective 1 April 1944. Personnel concurrently transferred to the 247th Army Air Field Base Unit, per a letter from Headquarters, SHAAF, Salina, Kansas (dated 10 Apr 1944).

== Roster ==
Known members of the 49th Aviation Squadron:

- Sergeant Andrew Bland, Chief mechanic, from Richmond, Virginia
- Sergeant Lloyd R. Brown
- Private Charles F. James, mechanic, from Jacksonville, Florida
- Staff Sergeant Henry S. McCullough
- Private Leroy Peters, aircraft electrician, from Philadelphia, Pennsylvania
