= 485th Air Expeditionary Wing =

485th Air Expeditionary Wing

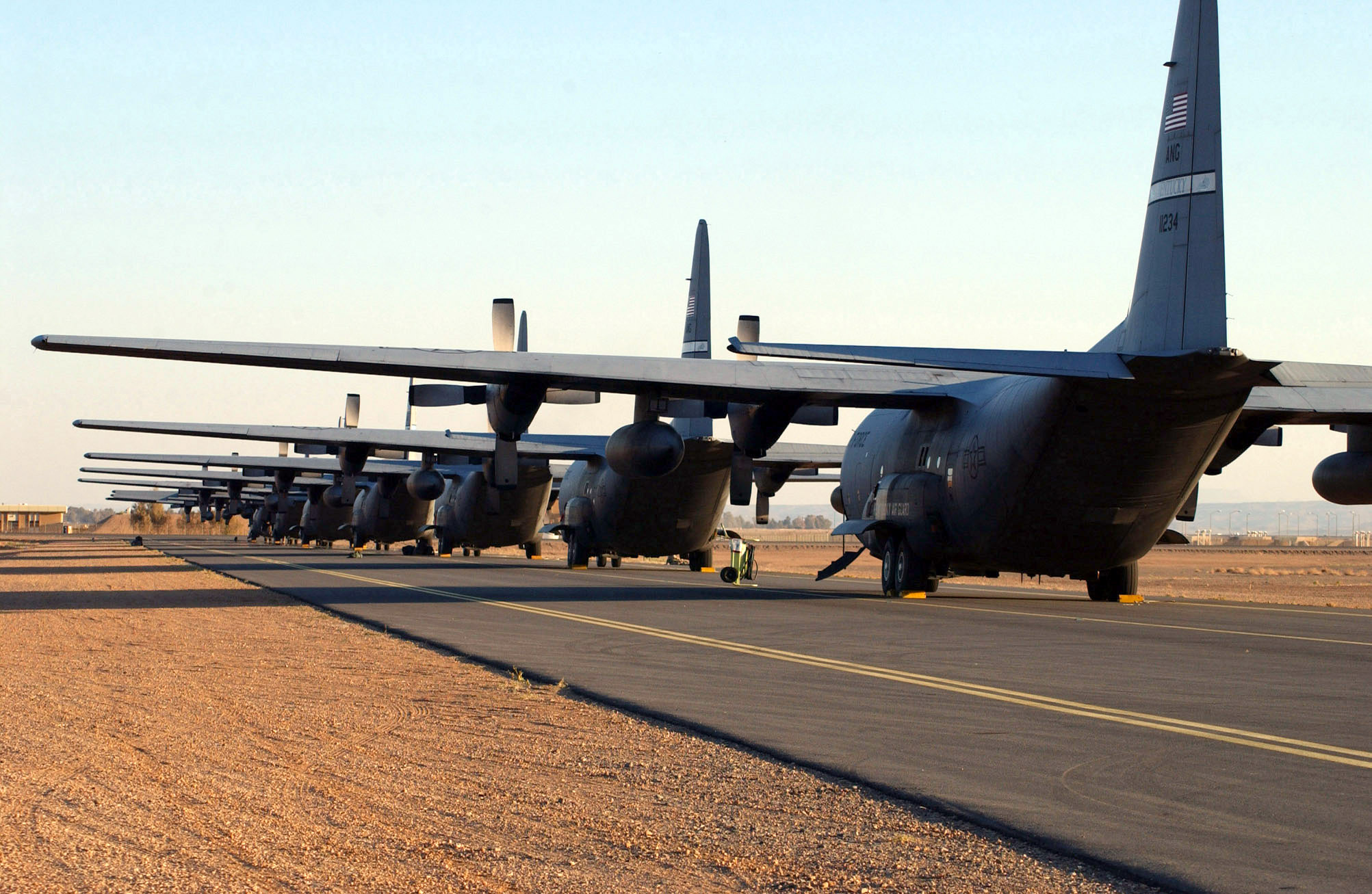
- A row of C-130 Hercules from the 485th Air Expeditionary Wing are parked at a forward-deployed location in Southwest Asia. Seven C-130 units combined to form the world's largest collection of the aircraft.
- Active: 1943–1946; 1956–1962; 1984–1989; 2003
- Country: United States
- Branch: United States Air Force
- Type: Provisional Wing
- Engagements: Mediterranean Theater of Operations Operation Iraqi Freedom
- Decorations: Distinguished Unit Citation; Air Force Outstanding Unit Award

Insignia
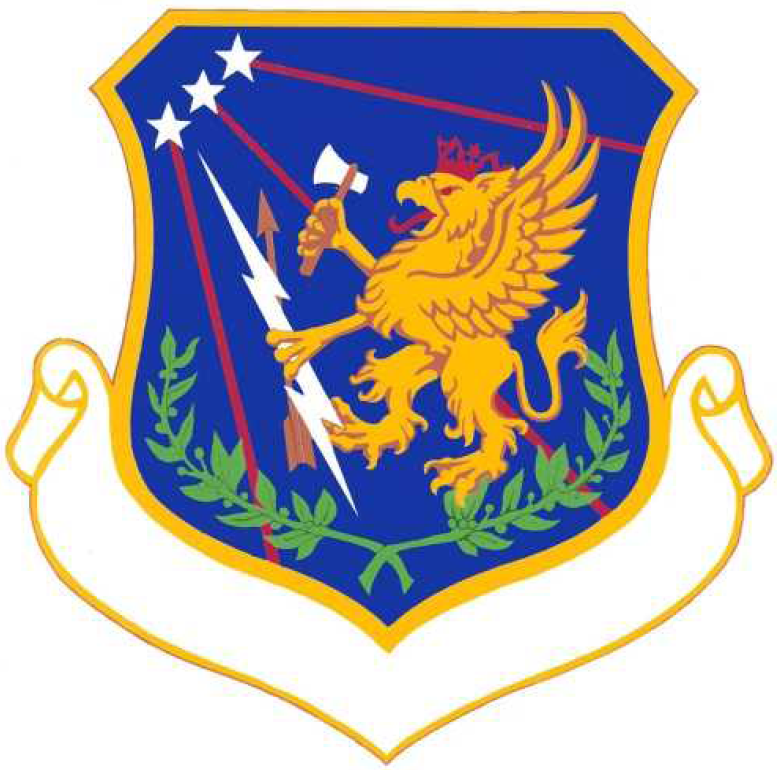
- 485th Air Expeditionary Wing emblem (Note: Approved 8 August 1984.)

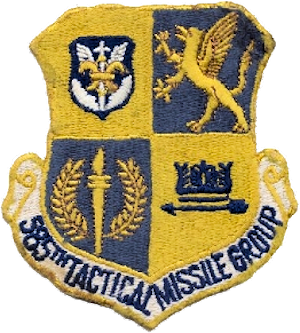
- Patch with 585th Tactical Missile Group emblem (Note: The group used its parent 38th Tactical Missile Wing emblem with the group designation on the scroll.)

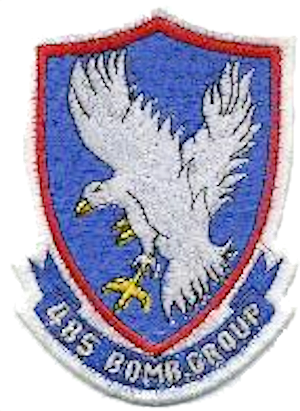
- Patch with later unofficial 485th Bombardment Group emblem (Note: Maurer indicates that neither emblem used by the group during World War II was officially approved. Maurer, Combat Units, p. 357.)

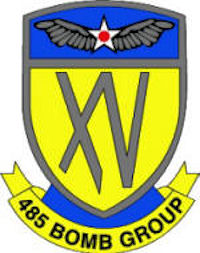
- Early unofficial 485th Bombardment Group emblem
- World War II Tail Markings: Top: Yellow with Black Square. Bottom: Black with Yellow X

The 485th Air Expeditionary Wing is a provisional United States Air Force unit assigned to Air Combat Command. As a provisional unit, the 485 AEW may be inactivated or activated at any time by Air Combat Command. The wing was last known to be active during Operation Iraqi Freedom in 2003 at Tabuk Regional Airport, Saudi Arabia, in 2003.

The wing was first activated as the 485th Bombardment Group, a Consolidated B-24 Liberator heavy bombardment group that served with Fifteenth Air Force during World War II. The group was awarded the Distinguished Unit Citation for its action in a mission to Vienna, Austria in 1944. The 485th returned to the United States in May 1945, where it converted to Boeing B-29 Superfortresss, training with Second Air Force. When the war ended in August 1945, the group remained at its training base and became one of the original ten bombardment groups assigned to Strategic Air Command (SAC). The group was inactivated in 1946 and its aircraft, personnel and equipment were transferred to the 97th Bombardment Group.

The second forerunner of the wing was the 585th Tactical Missile Group, which was stationed at Bitburg Air Base, Germany from 1956 to 1962. The 585th operated forward deployed TM-61 Matador cruise missiles from its home station. Later these missiles were replaced by TM-76 Mace (later MGM-13) missiles. It was inactivated in 1962 and its operational squadron transferred to the 38th Tactical Missile Wing.

In 1983, the two groups were consolidated as the 485th Tactical Missile Wing, a Ground Launched Cruise Missile (GLCM) wing stationed at Florennes Air Base, Belgium. The wing was inactivated as a result of the Intermediate-Range Nuclear Forces Treaty in 1989. In 2003 the wing was converted to provisional status as the 485th Air Expeditionary Wing and allotted to Air Combat Command.

== Overview ==
When activated in 2003, the 485 AEW was a composite wing of 24 McDonnell Douglas F-15C Eagle fighter aircraft and 46 Lockheed C-130H Hercules airlift aircraft and more than 3500 personnel from 82 different locations. The C-130s represented one of the largest combat groupings of this aircraft ever.

The wing was activated for Operation Iraqi Freedom and was composed of aircraft and regular Air Force personnel from Langley AFB, Virginia and Eglin AFB, Florida. It also included aircraft and guardsmen from the West Virginia, Tennessee, Missouri, Kentucky, Oklahoma, and Delaware Air National Guards, and reservists from Niagara Falls.

By 3 May 2003, the C-130 portion of the wing had flown 1199 missions, 3354 sorties, 7451 hours, hauled 9382 tons of cargo and 8800 passengers, and boasted a mission capable rate greater than 90 percent. When the F-15s completed flight operations 17 April they had compiled 581 sorties, flown more than 4000 hours and maintained a mission capable rate greater than 83 percent.

The wing was inactivated in early May 2003 with the last members returning to the United States in September of that year.

== History ==
=== World War II ===
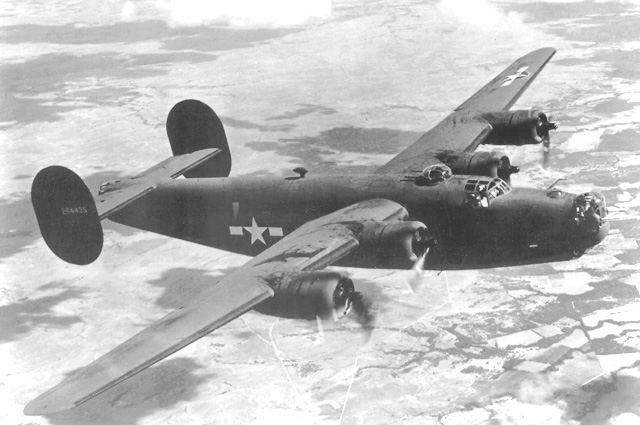
Consolidated B-24 Liberator

The wing was originally constituted as the 485th Bombardment Group (Heavy) and activated on 20 September 1943. Its original squadrons were the newly activated 828th, 829th, and 830th Bombardment Squadrons, which were joined a few days later by the 831st Bombardment Squadron at Gowen Field, Idaho. The 831st was an experienced Consolidated B-24 Liberator squadron that had been performing anti-submarine warfare missions as the 11th Antisubmarine Squadron. The group deployed to Gowen, where it derived its initial cadre from the 29th Bombardment Group and was assigned to Second Air Force for training with B-24s at Gowen and at Fairmont Army Air Field, Nebraska. The group deployed to the Mediterranean Theater of Operations (MTO) in March and April 1944.

Although the ground echelon had deployed to Southern Italy by April 1944, the air echelon was detained in Tunisia for further training. The group entered combat with Fifteenth Air Force in May 1944. The 485th engaged in very long range strategic bombing missions to enemy military, industrial and transportation targets in Italy, France, Germany, Austria, Hungary, Romania, and Yugoslavia, bombing marshalling yards, oil refineries, airfields, heavy industry, and other strategic objectives.

The group received a Distinguished Unit Citation for combating intense fighter opposition and attacking an oil refinery at Vienna on 26 June 1944. The 485th also carried out some support and interdiction operations. It struck bridges, harbors, and troop concentrations in August 1944 to aid Operation Dragoon, the invasion of southern France, It hit lines of communications and other targets during March and April 1945 to support the advance of British Eighth Army in northern Italy. It flew its 187th and last combat mission against Linz, Austria before preparing to return to the United States and re-equip.

The 485th returned to the United States in May 1945 and was programmed for deployment to the Pacific Theater of Operations (PTO) as a Boeing B-29 Superfortress very heavy bombardment group. Many combat veterans of MTO demobilized upon arrival in the United States, and a small cadre of personnel reformed at Sioux Falls Army Airfield, South Dakota at the end of May. The group was reassigned to Second Air Force for training in Iowa. Because B-29 groups had only three combat squadrons, the 831st Bombardment Squadron was inactivated in August. The group then moved on paper to Smoky Hill Army Air Field, Kansas in September.

The group remained on active duty after the Japanese surrender. In March 1946 Continental Air Forces became Strategic Air Command and Second Air Force was replaced by Fifteenth Air Force as the group's intermediate headquarters. Simultaneously, the 506th Bombardment Squadron was assigned to the group from the 44th Bombardment Group. In August 1946 the personnel and equipment of the 485th were reassigned to the 97th Bombardment Group and the 485th was inactivated.

=== Matador and Mace era ===
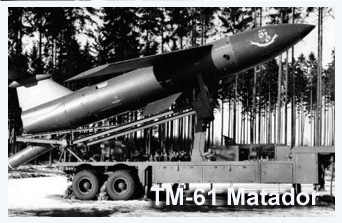
TM-61 Matador Missile on its launcher in Germany

In 1954 USAF began deploying TM-61 Matador cruise missiles to Germany. By 1956, three squadrons were in place and USAFE organized the 701st Tactical Missile Wing with a subordinate group at each of the main bases where Matadors were stationed. The 585th Tactical Missile Group was activated at Bitburg Air Base, Germany in September 1956 to command the 1st Tactical Missile Squadron and two support squadrons.

Shortly after activation the group began upgrading its TM-61A missiles to TM-61Cs. The TM-61C was equipped with the Shannicle guidance system which generated a grid the missile could use to navigate, replacing the ground to air steering systems of the TM-61A. The group participated in periodic test launches of Matadors at Wheelus AB, Libya.

In 1958, USAFE replaced the 701st wing with the 38th Tactical Missile Wing in an administrative move to keep on active duty units whose roots could be traced to World War II. Simultaneously, the 1st squadron was replaced by the 71st Tactical Missile Squadron, one of the historical elements of the WW II 38th Bombardment Group. The Matador was growing obsolescent and the last Matador was taken off Victor (nuclear) Alert on 30 June 1962.

The group replaced its Matadors with TM-76 Mace (later MGM-13) missiles. These missiles did not rely on ground signals for guidance, but used an onboard radar to match the terrain with a map stored on board the missile. In 1962 the 585th and its companion groups in Germany were inactivated and the missile squadrons assigned directly to the 38th Wing. On the same day, the last Matador at Bitburg was decommissioned.

=== Ground Launched Cruise Missile era ===
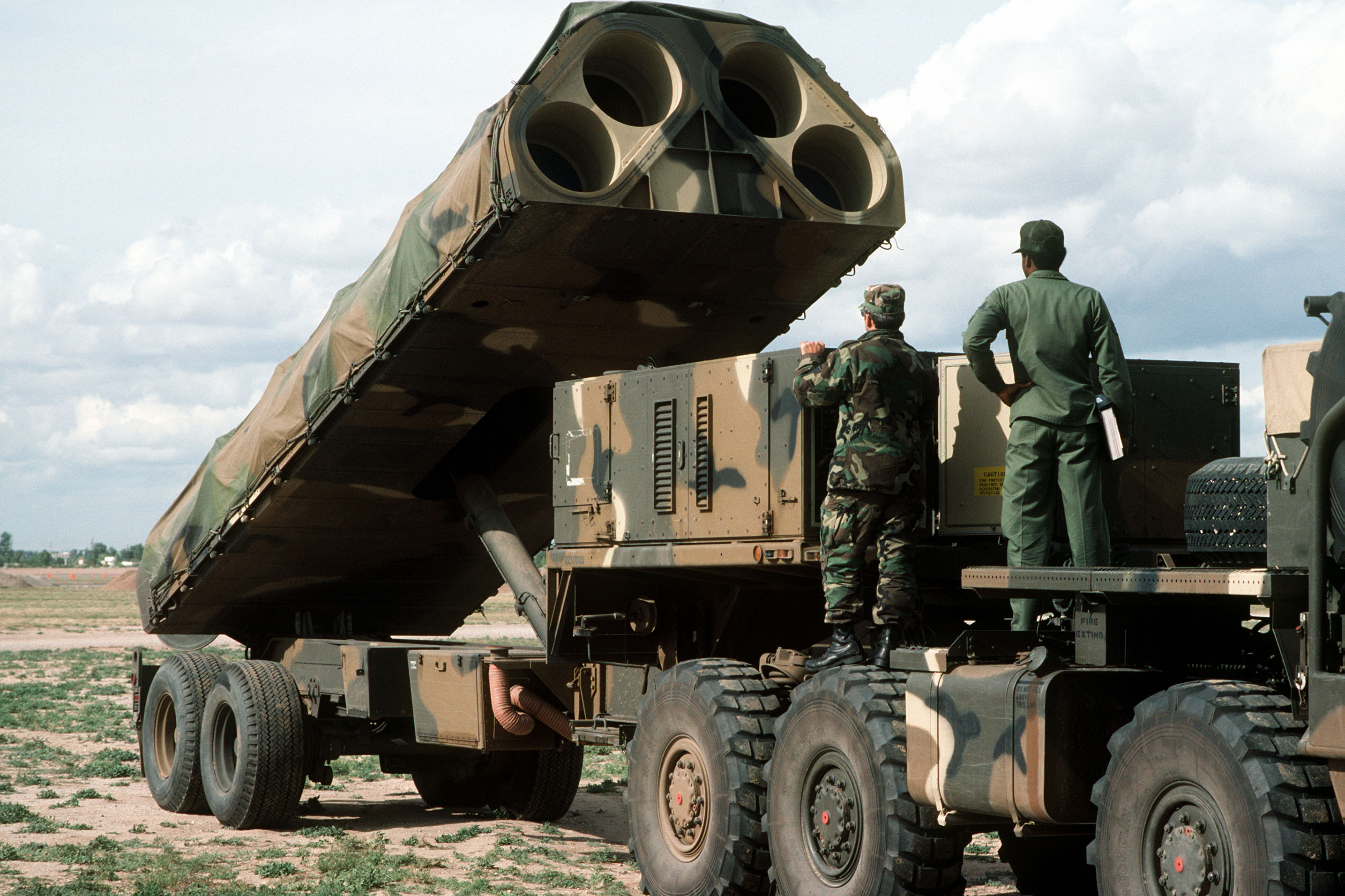
BGM-109 Gryphon transporter erector launcher

The 485th Tactical Missile Wing was activated at Florennes Air Base, Belgium in August 1984. The first Gryphon missile arrived on 28 August and the wing began operating the Gryphon from 1985 until the implementation of the Intermediate-Range Nuclear Forces Treaty in 1988.

The wing and its base were the target of periodic peace movement protests near the main gate. In August 1988 a ten-man Soviet Inspection Team visited Florennes to insure treaty compliance. The wing was inactivated in 1989 with the withdrawal of American forces from Florennes.

== Lineage ==
485th Bombardment Group

- Constituted as 485th Bombardment Group (Heavy) on 14 September 1943

Activated on 20 September 1943
Redesignated 485th Bombardment Group, Heavy on 25 January 1944

- Redesignated 485th Bombardment Group, Very Heavy on 5 August 1945

Inactivated on 4 August 1946

585th Tactical Missile Group

- Constituted as 585th Tactical Missile Group on 3 August 1956

Activated on 15 September 1956
Inactivated on 25 September 1962

485th Air Expeditionary Wing

485th Bombardment Group and 585th Tactical Missile Group consolidated on 19 December 1983 as the 485th Tactical Missile Wing
Activated on 1 August 1984
Inactivated on 30 September 1989

- Redesignated 485th Air Expeditionary Wing and converted to provisional status 30 January 2003

c. 4 March 2003 – c. May 2003

=== Assignments ===
- Second Air Force, 20 September 1943
- 55th Bombardment Wing, 14 March 1944 – 15 May 1945
- Army Service Forces, Port of Embarkation, 30 May 1945
- Second Air Force, 1 August 1945
- Fifteenth Air Force, 21 March 1946 – 4 August 1946
- 701st Tactical Missile Wing, 15 September 1956
- 38th Tactical Missile Wing, 18 June 1958 – 25 September 1962
- Seventeenth Air Force, 1 August 1984 – 30 September 1989
- Air Combat Command for activation or inactivation at any time after 30 January 2003

Attached to United States Central Command Air Forces, c. 4 March 2003 – c. May 2003

=== Components ===
==== Groups ====
- 485th Combat Support Group: 1 October 1984 – 30 April 1989
- 485th Security Police Group: 1 October 1984 – 30 April 1989

==== Squadrons ====
Tactical Squadrons

- 1st Tactical Missile Squadron: 15 September 1956 – 18 June 1958
- 71st Tactical Missile Squadron: 18 June 1958 – 25 September 1962; 1 August 1984 – 30 April 1989
- 506th Bombardment Squadron: 7 March 1946 – 4 August 1946
- 828th Bombardment Squadron: 20 September 1943 – 4 August 1946
- 829th Bombardment Squadron: 20 September 1943 – 4 August 1946
- 830th Bombardment Squadron: 20 September 1943 – 6 May 1946
- 831st Bombardment Squadron: 1 October 1943 – 20 August 1945

Support Squadrons

- 585th Command and Guidance Squadron (Tactical Missile) (later 585th Missile Maintenance Squadron, 485th Tactical Missile Maintenance Squadron): 15 September 1956 – 25 September 1962; 1 August 1984 – 30 April 1989
- 585th Support Squadron (Tactical Missile): 15 September 1956 – 25 September 1962
- USAF Clinic, Florennes (later 485th USAF Clinic): 1 October 1984 – 30 April 1989

=== Stations ===
- Fairmont Army Air Field, Nebraska, 20 September 1943 – 11 March 1944 (operated from Gowen Field, Idaho 27 September 1943 – 15 November 1943)
- Venosa Airfield, Italy, April 1944 – 15 May 1945
- Sioux Falls Army Air Field, South Dakota, 30 May 1945
- Sioux City Army Air Base, Iowa, 24 July 1945
- Smoky Hill Army Air Field, Kansas, 8 September 1945 – 4 August 1946
- Bitburg Air Base, West Germany, 15 September 1956 – 25 September 1962
- Florennes Air Base, Belgium 4 August 1984 – 30 September 1989
- Tabuk Regional Airport, Saudi Arabia, c. 4 March 2003 – c. May 2003

==== Missile Sites ====
- Matador/Mace

Site VII "B" Pad – 3.5 miles (5.6 km) NW of Bitburg AB (1st/71st TMS) 49°59′05″N 006°28′50″E (Note: An underground concrete launch facility that was closed in 1962. Presently it is abandoned and largely overgrown.)
Site VIII "C" Pad – 4.5 miles (7.2 km) SSW of Bitburg AB (1st/71st TMS) 49°53′21″N 006°33′30″E (Note: n underground concrete launch facility. After closure the site was transferred to the Bundeswehr and converted into an MIM-104 Patriot missile site. The site closed in 2001 and is now abandoned and overgrown.)
Missile Support Area – 2.6 miles (4.2 km) SSW of Bitburg AB 49°58′11″N 006°28′27″E

- GLCM

50°13′34″N 004°39′01″E

=== Aircraft and missiles ===
- B-24 Liberator, 1943–1945
- Boeing B-29 Superfortress, 1945–1946
- Martin Matador TM-61A, 1956–1957
- Martin Matador TM-61C, 1957–1962
- Martin Mace TM-76B, ? – ?
- General Dynamics BGM-109G Gryphon, 1985–1988
- McDonnell Douglas F-15 Eagle, 2003
- Lockheed C-130 Hercules, 2003
- Lockheed C-5 Galaxy (2003)

=== Awards and campaigns ===
Award streamer	Award	Dates	Notes
	Distinguished Unit Citation	26 June 1944	Vienna, Austria – 485th Bombardment Group
	Air Force Outstanding Unit Award	15 September 1956 – 30 April 1958	585th Tactical Missile Group
	Air Force Outstanding Unit Award	1 April 1959 – 30 January 1961	585th Tactical Missile Group
	Air Force Outstanding Unit Award	30 June 1986 – 30 June 1988	485th Tactical Missile Wing

Campaign Streamer	Campaign	Dates	Notes
	Air Offensive, Europe		
	Rome-Arno		
	Normandy		
	Northern France		
	Southern France		
	North Apennines		
	Rhineland		
	Central Europe		
	Po Valley		
	Air Combat, EAME Theater		

== See also ==
- List of BGM-109G GLCM Units
- 519th Air Service Group Support Unit during World War II
