= Fairmont State Airfield =

Fairmont State Airfield (former Fairmont Army Airfield)
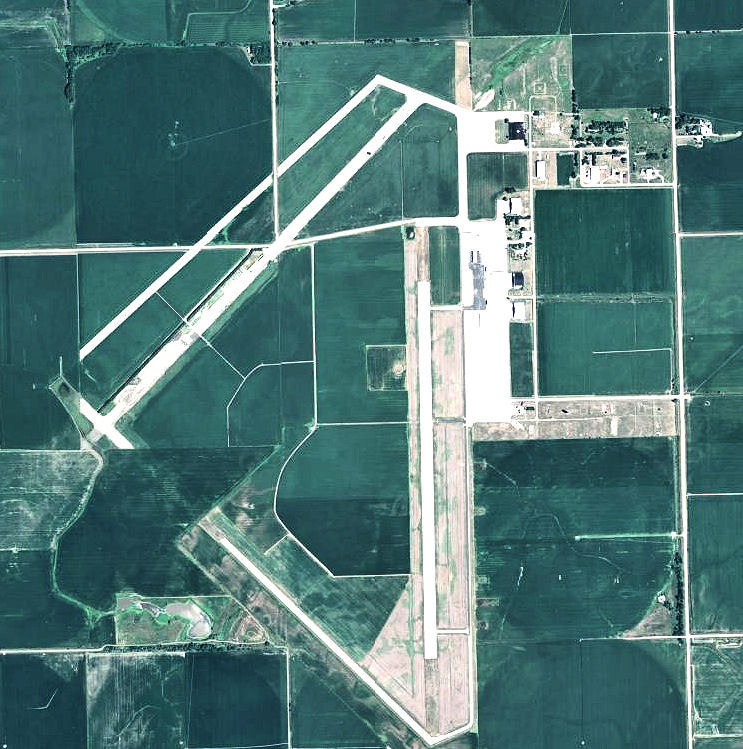
- USGS 2006 orthophoto
- IATA: none; ICAO: KFMZ; FAA LID: FMZ

Summary
- Airport type: Public
- Owner: Nebraska Department of Aeronautics
- Serves: Fairmont, Nebraska
- Location: Madison Township, Fillmore County
- Elevation AMSL: 1,636 ft (499 m)
- Coordinates: 40°35′10″N 097°34′23″W

Map
- Location of airport in Nebraska / United States FMZ (the United States)

Runways
Direction	Length		Surface
Direction	ft	m	Surface
17/35	4,317	1,316	Concrete
12/30	3,021	921	Concrete

Statistics (2012)
- Aircraft operations: 1,625
- Based aircraft: 21
- Source: Federal Aviation Administration

- Fairmont Army Airfield
- U.S. National Register of Historic Places
- U.S. Historic district
- Location within Nebraska Location within the United States
- Nearest city: Fairmont, Nebraska
- Area: 1,827 acres (739 ha)
- Built: 1942
- Architectural style: Aircraft hangars
- NRHP reference No.: 03000105
- Added to NRHP: March 11, 2003

Fairmont State Airfield (ICAO: KFMZ, FAA LID: FMZ) is three miles south of Fairmont, in Fillmore County, Nebraska. The National Plan of Integrated Airport Systems for 2011–2015 categorized it as a general aviation facility. It has no scheduled airline service.

Most U.S. airports use the same three-letter location identifier for the FAA and IATA, but this airport is FMZ to the FAA and has no IATA code.

== History ==
Construction of Fairmont State Airfield by the United States Army Air Forces began on September 17, 1942. It was one of eleven training airfields built in Nebraska during World War II. Shortly after construction began, a railroad spur was built from Fairmont to the site to haul materials for the construction. About 1,000 laborers were hired to build the base, and the small towns of Geneva (pop. 1,888) and Fairmont (pop. 800) were hard pressed to find housing for the workers. Early in the construction, the facility was referred to as the Fairmont Satellite Airfield, and was designated a satellite of the Topeka Army Air Base in Kansas, however by early 1943, the name was changed to the Fairmont Army Airfield, as its mission was determined to be a training facility for heavy bomber groups. The first military personnel arrived in November 1942

The airfield was under the command of Second Air Force Headquarters, Colorado Springs, Colorado. The 241st Army Air Force Base Unit was the Operational Training Unit at the airfield. It was assigned to the 15th Bombardment Training Wing (September 1943 – March 1944), then transferred to the 17th Bombardment Training Wing in March 1944 for B-29 training. The 511th Army Air Force Base Unit commanded the support elements at Fairmont as part of Air Technical Service Command.

Fairmont Army Airfield was a training installation for twenty-seven bombardment squadrons. Complete engine and airframe repairs were available for Consolidated B-24 Liberator and eventually in the more technologically advanced Boeing B-29 Superfortress bombers at the five hangars on the field. Extensive concrete runways and other structures were built. A 350-bed hospital served personnel from Fairmont along with Harvard AAF and Bruning AAF. The cantonment area provided quarters for nearly 6,000 officers and enlisted men.

Known units that trained at Fairmont AAF were:

- 485th Bombardment Group (September 20, 1943 – March 11, 1944)

828th, 829th, 830th and 831st Bombardment Squadrons
Deployed to: Fifteenth Air Force, in Italy (B-24 Liberator)

- 451st Bombardment Group (September 9 – November 16, 1943)

724th, 725th, 726th and 727th Bombardment Squadrons
Deployed to: Fifteenth Air Force, in Italy (B-24 Liberator)

- 504th Bombardment Group (March 12 – November 5, 1945)

393rd, 398th, 421st and 507th Bombardment Squadrons
Deployed to: Twentieth Air Force in Tinian (B-29 Superfortress)

- 16th Bombardment Group (August 15, 1944 – March 7, 1945)

15th, 16th and 17th Bombardment Squadrons
Deployed to: Twentieth Air Force in Guam (B-29 Superfortress)

- 98th Bombardment Group (May 6 – June 25, 1945)

343rd, 344th, 345th, and 415th Bombardment Squadrons
Trained on B-29 Superfortresses but inactivated in November 1945

- 467th Bombardment Group (July 25 – August 25, 1945)

788th, 789th, 790th and 791st Bombardment Squadrons
Trained on B-29 Superfortresses but inactivated in August 1946

- 489th Bombardment Group (July 3 – August 25, 1945)

844th, 845th, 846th and 847th Bombardment Squadrons
Trained on B-29 Superfortresses but inactivated in October 1945

In September 1944 Lt. Col. Paul Tibbets visited Fairmont and selected the 393d Bombardment Squadron of the 504th to join the 509th Composite Group at Wendover AAF, Utah. This group dropped both atomic bombs on Japan.

The base was inactivated on December 31, 1945. In the spring of 1946, the War Assets Administration declared the property surplus in the spring of 1946. Buildings were sold and dismantled or moved. The chapel was moved to Friend, Nebraska. The Enlisted Men's Service Club was dismantled and rebuilt in Shickley, Nebraska as St. Mary's Church. In 1946 Nebraska Department of Aeronautics acquired the Airfield from the U.S. Government for use as a state-owned civilian airport.

The Fairmont Army Airfield, with its well maintained hangars, support buildings, and commander's house, was the best remaining example, as a collection of buildings, of the Army Airfields in the State of Nebraska. Due to the rural location, unencumbered by surrounding development, and the good condition of the remaining buildings, particularly the hangars, the Fairmont Army Airfield was placed on the National Register of Historic Places as an historic district. The District includes the hardstands, aprons and existing runways, all remaining buildings, extending to the edges of the roads where buildings remain. This encompasses historic landscape features such as roads and World War II-era planted trees.

== Facilities ==
Fairmont State Airfield covers 687 acres (278 ha) at an elevation of 1,636 feet (499 m). It has two concrete runways: 17/35 is 4,317 by 75 feet (1,316 x 23 m) and 12/30 is 3,021 by 60 feet (921 x 18 m).

In the year ending June 12, 2012 the airport had 1,625 aircraft operations, average 135 per month: 99.7% general aviation and 0.3% military. 21 aircraft were then based at this airport: 95% single-engine and 5% multi-engine.

== See also ==
- Nebraska World War II Army Airfields
- List of airports in Nebraska
