= Salina Regional Airport =

Airport in Salina, Kansas, U.S.

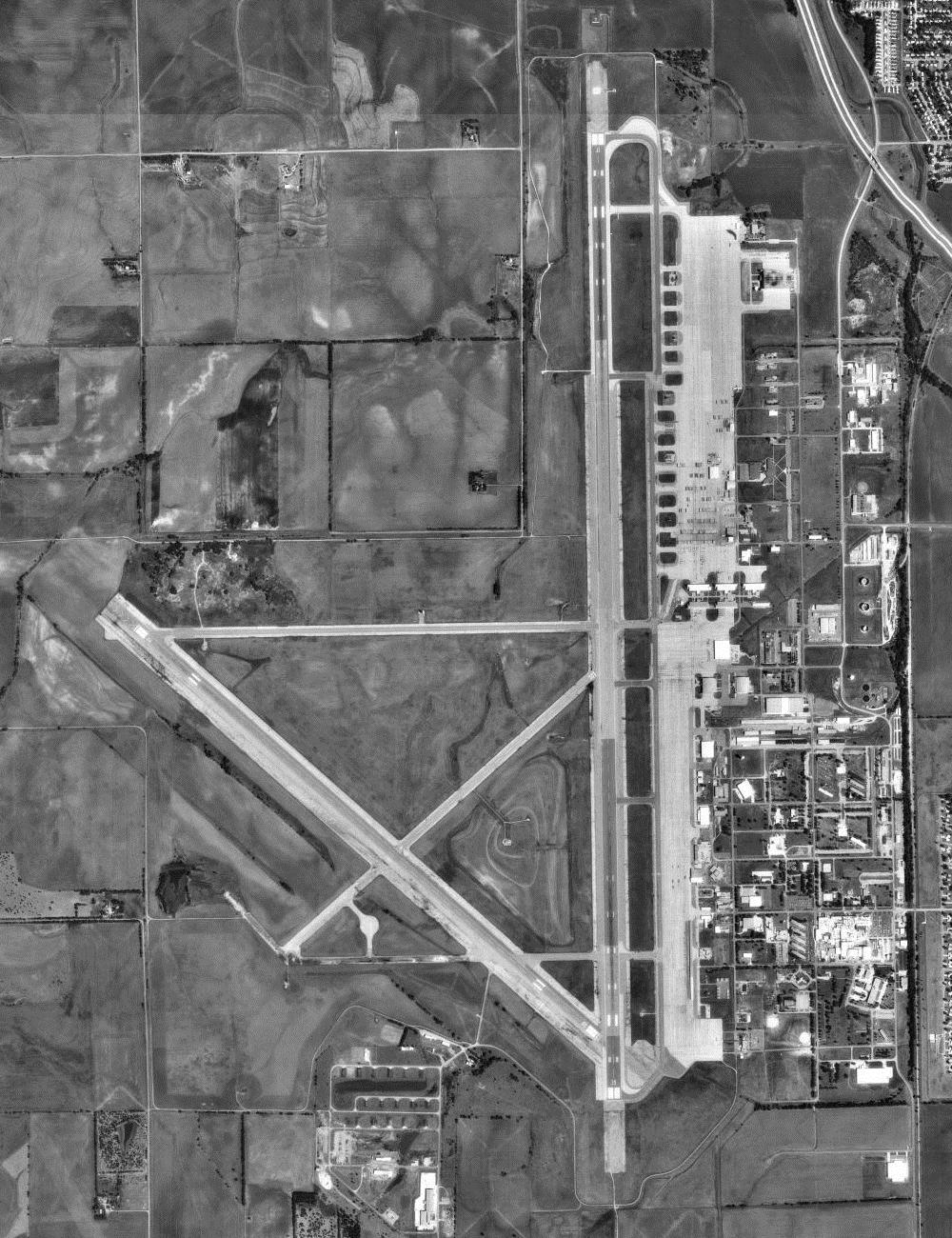
- USGS 1991 orthophoto
- IATA: SLN; ICAO: KSLN; FAA LID: SLN

Summary
- Airport type: Public
- Owner: Salina Airport Authority
- Serves: Salina, Kansas
- Elevation AMSL: 1,288 ft (393 m)
- Coordinates: 38°47′26″N 097°39′08″W
- Website: salinaairport.com

Map
- Location within Kansas Location within the United States

Runways
Direction	Length		Surface
Direction	ft	m	Surface
17/35	12,301	3,749	Asphalt
12/30	6,510	1,984	Asphalt
18/36	4,301	1,311	Asphalt
4/22	3,648	1,112	Asphalt

Statistics (2023)
- Aircraft operations (year ending 3/31/2023): 70,884
- Based aircraft (2023): 120
- Source: Federal Aviation Administration

Salina Regional Airport (IATA: SLN, ICAO: KSLN, FAA LID: SLN), formerly Salina Municipal Airport, is located in Salina, Kansas, United States. The airport is owned by the Salina Airport Authority. It is used for general aviation, and has service from one passenger airline, SkyWest Airlines (operating as United Express), which is subsidized by the Essential Air Service program.

Salina Regional Airport is the home of K-State Salina and its Department of Aviation which offers Professional Pilot degrees along with several other degrees in the field of aviation.

The airport is on the site of the former Schilling Air Force Base (previously Smoky Hill Air Force Base and Smoky Hill Army Air Field).

== History ==
The construction of military bases after the Pearl Harbor Attack that caused the entry of the United States into World War II resulted in the construction of the Smoky Hill Army Air Field (AAF) on 2,600 acres (1,052 ha), southwest of Salina, Kansas. The first unit associated with the airfield was the 376th Base Headquarters and Air Base Squadron, whose engineers first laid out the base in April 1942. Construction began in May 1942 with the aid of nearly 7,000 workers. The airfield was activated on September 1, 1942, and was assigned to the II Bomber Command, Second Air Force.

Enough construction was completed that the 376th moved into facilities on September 10. The first aircraft to arrive, Boeing B-17 Flying Fortresses, arrived later that month and were assigned to the 346th Bombardment Group. The mission of Smoky Hill AAF was that of a Second Phase Heavy Bomber Operational Training Unit (OTU). In the second phase of training, combat groups formed in the first phase focused on the teamwork of the full combat crew, such as bombing, gunnery, and instrument flight missions. Upon completion, the groups moved on to the third phase, the final level of training before overseas deployment to the combat theaters.

In April 1943, the 49th Aviation Squadron arrived at Smoky Hill; the all-African American unit included mechanics, electricians, and aircraft handlers but no pilots. The 366th was joined by the 400th Bombardment Group in the training mission at Smoky Hill AAF on July 31, 1943. The 366th concentrated on B-17 Flying Fortress training; the 400th on B-24 Liberator training.

On March 21, 1946, as the Army Air Forces underwent significant restructuring, the airfield was transferred to the Fifteenth Air Force, then part of the Strategic Air Command. Then in January 1948, following the formation of the United States Air Force, the airfield was renamed Smoky Hill Air Force Base.

As postwar budgets declined, the base was eventually closed and turned over to the Air Materiel Command late in 1949.

As the Air Force's needs grew during the Korean War, the base was reactivated on August 1, 1951. The base hosted the 310th and 40th Bombardment Wings.

On March 16, 1957, the base was renamed Schilling Air Force Base, in honor of Colonel David C. Schilling.

Throughout 1964, rumors circulated that the base was being considered for a shutdown. In November, Defense Secretary Robert McNamara announced that Schilling AFB, along with 94 other military installations, would be closing. The shutdown began in 1965 and was completed in 1967.

The airport was the takeoff and landing point for the Virgin Atlantic GlobalFlyer, flown by Steve Fossett in the first nonstop, non-refueled solo circumnavigation of the earth from February 28 to March 3, 2005. In 2006, Fossett embarked on another such flight in the GlobalFlyer, again departing and arriving Salina, from March 14 to 17, 2006. This time he broke the world record for distance over a closed circuit without landing, which he had set a month prior.

Salina Regional Airport has memorialized the records set by Steve Fossett with Fossett Plaza. The plaza has a memorial, seating area, plaques with the story of the Global Flyer and Steve Fossett, and a viewing area to observe operations.

=== Historical airline service ===
Salina received its first scheduled airline service in the early 1930s by United States Airways, which flew a Metal Aircraft Flamingo on an airmail route between Denver and Kansas City, stopping at Goodland, Salina, and Topeka, Kansas. This route was discontinued about 1933 and airline service did not return to Salina until 1949.

Continental Airlines then began stopping at Salina with Douglas DC-3s in 1949, also on a route between Denver and Kansas City, making as many as ten stops at smaller cities throughout Colorado and Kansas. Continental's service continued until 1961.

Central Airlines replaced Continental in 1961, also using DC-3s, but later upgrading with Convair 240 and Convair 600 aircraft. In 1967 Central merged into Frontier Airlines which used Convair 580s, and in early 1978 introduced Boeing 737 jets to Salina on flights to Denver and Chicago, the latter making three stops en route. The Chicago flights were later replaced with service to Kansas City, and Frontier was soon flying all 737 jets through Salina up to four times per day. All Frontier service ended on January 6, 1983.

Air Midwest first began service to Salina as an air taxi in the late 1960s, with flights to Wichita using Cessna 402s. The carrier suspended service for a few years, then returned from 1972 through 1976 with flights to both Kansas City and Wichita using Beechcraft 99s. Air Midwest returned again in 1983 to replace Frontier's service with flights to Denver, Kansas City, and Wichita, using Fairchild Swearingen Metroliners; however, the Denver flights were soon discontinued. In 1986 Air Midwest began a series of code share relationships with major carriers operating feeder flights on behalf of a major carrier:

1986-1988 as Eastern Express to Kansas City using the Metroliners as well as Saab 340 aircraft.

1988-1989 as Braniff Express to Kansas City using Metroliners.

1990-1991 as Trans World Express (on behalf of TWA) to St. Louis with a stop in Manhattan, Kansas, using Embraer 120 Brasilia's.

1991-2008 as USAir Express to Kansas City using Beechcraft 1900 aircraft. All Air Midwest service ended in mid-2008.

Capitol Air Service provided a single daily flight to Kansas City with stops in Manhattan and Topeka, Kansas from 1982 through 1988. The carrier used a de Havilland Canada DHC-6 Twin Otter and operated as Braniff Express during its final two years.

Great Lakes Airlines first served Salina briefly in 2000-2001, operating as United Express with flights to Hays and Denver, using Beechcraft 1900Ds. The carrier returned in 2008, replacing Air Midwest's service to Kansas City until 2010.

SeaPort Airlines came to Salina in 2010, replacing Great Lakes with flights to Kansas City. SeaPort first flew Pilatus PC-12 aircraft then later flew Cessna 208 Caravans. Service ended in 2016.

Great Lakes returned once again in 2016, replacing SeaPort, but operating flights to Denver using Embraer 120 Brasilias. Great Lakes went out of business in 2018.

SkyWest Airlines, the current provider operating as United Express, began service in 2018 using Bombardier CRJ100/200 regional jets. Initially, one daily nonstop to Chicago and two daily flights to Denver with a stop in Hays, KS were provided; however, service was trimmed back in 2020 to one daily nonstop to each city.

The airport is served under the Essential Air Service program where an individual carrier is selected and receives government funding to provide service to smaller communities.

== Facilities ==
The airport covers 2,862 acres (1,158 ha) at an elevation of 1,288 feet (393 m). It has four asphalt runways: 17/35 is 12,301 by 150 feet (3,749 x 46 m); 12/30 is 6,510 by 100 feet (1,984 x 30 m); 18/36 is 4,301 by 75 feet (1,311 x 23 m); 4/22 is 3,648 by 75 feet (1,112 x 23 m).

In the year ending March 31, 2023, the airport had 70,884 aircraft operations, average 194 per day.

Having a long runway and being 85 miles southeast from the continental center of the United States, the airport sees many corporate and private jets that stop to refuel and allow passengers to have a break, earning Salina the moniker "America's Fuel Stop." Avflight Salina is responsible for all fueling and ground handling of transient and military aircraft.

The airport hosts a variety of Forward Operating Location (FOL) activity and has been the operating site for many missions by NASA, NOAA, Wings of Freedom, the Commemorative Air Force and Virgin Atlantic Global.

== Airline and destinations ==
=== Passenger ===
United Express connects Salina Airport to Denver International Airport, O'Hare International Airport (Chicago), and George Bush Intercontinental Airport (Houston).

Destinations map
Destinations from Salina Regional Airport

== Environmental contamination ==
A report from the 40th Bombardment Wing in 1953 described the problem. "One of the foremost and the first problems encountered was an excessive amount of solvent being required to properly wash and clean aircraft," the report said. "Some method of reducing the amount of solvent used was needed. This problem was met by installing a system of settling tanks ... Approximately 12,000 to 14,000 gallons of solvent are used per month."

In 1989 the Salina School District unearthed three of 107 underground fuel storage tanks on its vo-tech property. It first became known that Trichlorethylene (TCE), a degreaser used to clean aircraft and a carcinogen, as well as other compounds disposed of on the former base, have migrated into the soil and groundwater, forming a toxic plume. In 1999, the US Army Corps of Engineers published its first remedial investigation. In 2005 the Corps shared the draft of a second remedial investigation of the contamination in the Salina Airport Industrial Area. Residents in the area of the plume were advised not to drink the water, per the Kansas Department of Health and Environment. Soilwater intrusion assays in 1999 by EPA and again in 2005 showed vapor levels inside Kansas State University's Tullis building did not exceed state standards for air quality, but they may exceed federal EPA guidelines. As of 2005, the federal government had spent more than $17 million studying the problem in its jurisdiction. In December 2007 the Corps groundwater contamination cleanup was put on hold. In August 2008, the city of Salina offered to clean-up former Schilling AFB, as suggested by the Corps.

In 2010, after the plume had reached residential areas near the former base, Salina officials, the Salina Airport Authority, the Salina school district and Kansas State University – Salina (now Kansas State University Polytechnic Campus), who own 96% of the property filed a federal lawsuit in Kansas City, Kansas, for the clean up costs. In spring of 2013 the Department of Justice signed a settlement that the government would pay $8.4 million merely toward developing the plan to clean up the former base. A remedial investigation, feasibility study and cleanup remedy were estimated to cost about $9.3 million, of which the Salina public entities agreed to pay $936,300. The Kansas Department of Health and Environment oversees the cleanup process. As of September 2015 studies have continued to find groundwater contamination in soil and bedrock, and no concentrations of vapor requiring immediate action were found in an area around Salina Regional Airport.

== See also ==
- List of airports in Kansas

== Other sources ==
- Essential Air Service documents (Docket DOT-OST-2002-11376) from the U.S. Department of Transportation:
  - 90 Day Notice (January 23, 2002): from Midwest Express Inc., a Mesa Air Group subsidiary, of intent to discontinue scheduled non-subsidized Essential Air Service between Salina, Kansas, and Kansas City effective April 20, 2002.
  - Order 2002-3-31 (March 29, 2002): prohibiting Air Midwest, Inc., d/b/a US Airways Express, from terminating its unsubsidized service at Salina, Kansas; and requiring the carrier to maintain service between the community and Kansas City, Missouri, for an initial 30-day period following the end of the notice period; and requesting proposals from carriers interested in providing replacement service at the community.
  - Order 2004-2-14 (February 17, 2004): selects Air Midwest, Inc., a wholly owned subsidiary of Mesa Air Group, Inc., d/b/a US Airways Express, to provide subsidized essential air service (EAS) for a two-year period at Manhattan and Salina, Kansas, at a combined annual subsidy rate of $721,605.
  - Order 2006-3-15 (March 15, 2006): re-selecting Air Midwest, Inc., a wholly owned subsidiary of Mesa Air Group, Inc., d/b/a US Airways Express, to provide subsidized essential air service (EAS) for the two-year period beginning March 1, 2006, at Manhattan and Salina, Kansas, at a combined annual subsidy rate of $974,008.
  - Order 2007-12-25 (December 21, 2007): re-selecting Air Midwest, Inc., a wholly owned subsidiary of Mesa Air Group, Inc., d/b/a US Airways Express to provide subsidized essential air service (EAS) at Manhattan and Salina, Kansas, for a total annual subsidy of $1,619,566 for the two-year period beginning March 1, 2008.
  - Order 2008-2-5 (February 1, 2008): prohibiting Air Midwest, Inc. a wholly owned subsidiary of Mesa Air Group, Inc., d/b/a US Airways Express from suspending its subsidized essential air services at Manhattan and Salina, Kansas, until Great Lakes Aviation, Ltd. begins full replacement service, and selecting Great Lakes to provide those services for a new two-year period at an annual subsidy rate of $1,997,237.
  - Order 2009-11-25 (November 30, 2009): requesting proposals from carriers interested in providing essential air service (EAS) at Salina, Kansas, for the two-year period beginning April 1, 2010, with or without subsidy. With respect to this order, we are soliciting proposals for service to Salina only. In the past, the communities of Salina and Manhattan were handled under the same contract because the flights were historically routed Salina-Manhattan-Kansas City. However, on or about August 26, 2009, American Eagle inaugurated subsidy-free regional jet service from Dallas-Fort Worth to Manhattan.
  - Order 2010-3-17 (March 12, 2010): selecting SeaPort Airlines to provide essential air service (EAS) at Salina, Kansas, for a first-year annual subsidy of $1,489,435 and a second-year of $1,493,381 for the two-year period beginning when it inaugurates full EAS.
  - Order 2012-2-4 (February 3, 2012): re-selecting SeaPort Airlines Inc. to provide Essential Air Service (EAS) at Salina, Kansas, using 9-seat Pilatus PC-12 aircraft for the four-year period beginning April 1, 2012, through March 31, 2016, for an annual subsidy of $1,490,479.
