= 414th Expeditionary Reconnaissance Squadron =

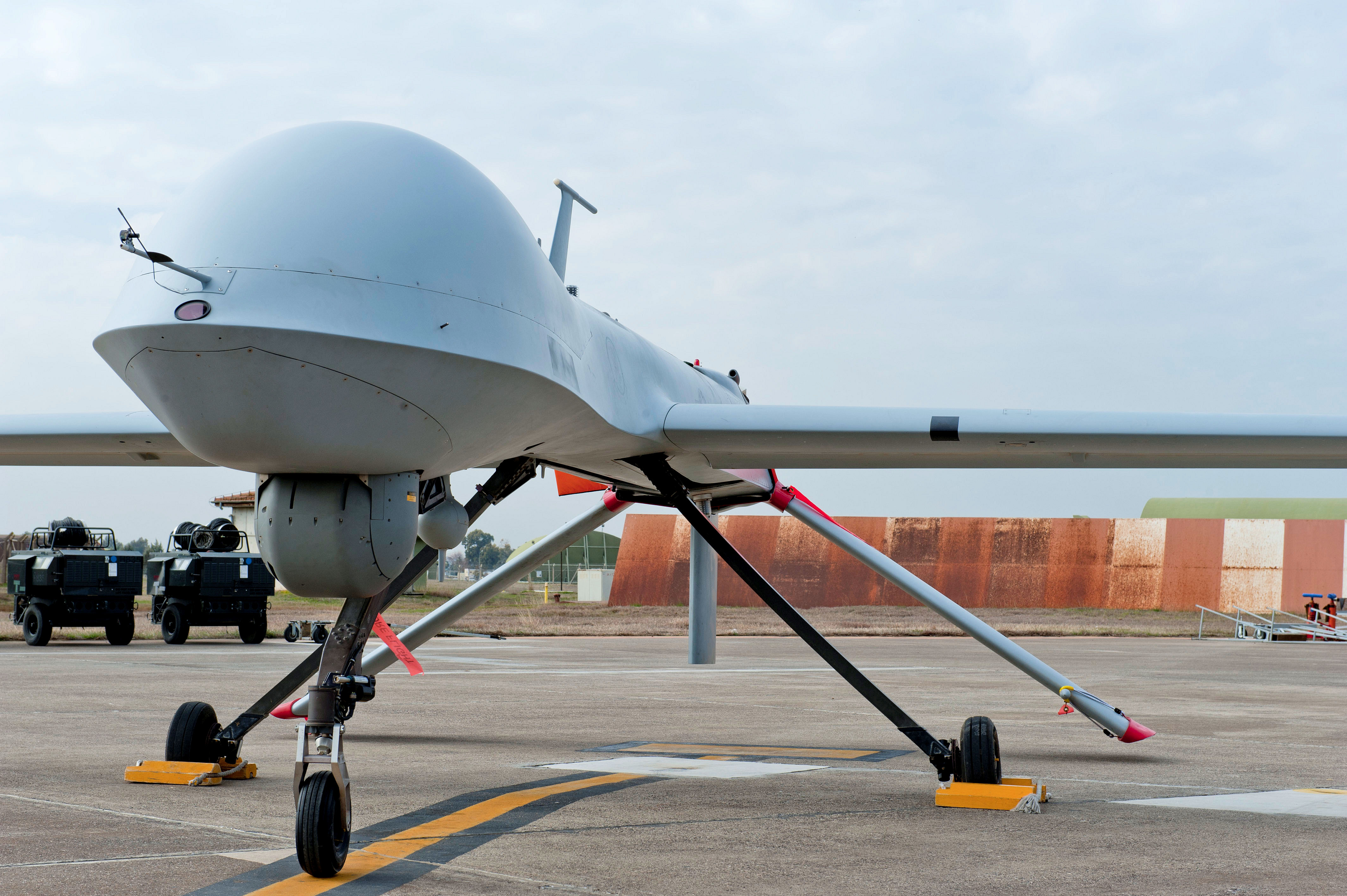
- A squadron MQ-1B Predator on the flight line at Incirlik Air Base, Turkey.
- Active: 1942–1945; 2011–present
- Country: United States
- Branch: United States Air Force
- Role: Aerial reconnaissance
- Part of: United States Air Forces in Europe
- Nickname: All American
- Engagements: European Theater of Operations
- Decorations: Distinguished Unit Citation; Air Force Meritorious Unit Award

Insignia
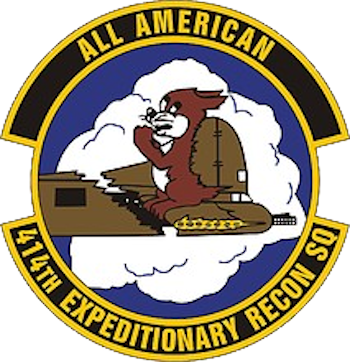
- 414th Expeditionary Reconnaissance Squadron emblem (Note: The squadron's Air Force Historical Research Agency Fact Sheet indicates that the 1944 emblem remains the official squadron emblem.)

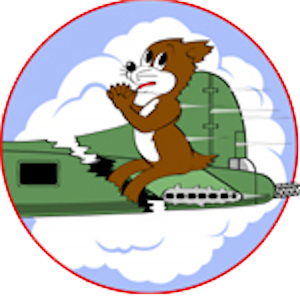
- 414th Bombardment Squadron emblem (Note: Approved 24 June 1944. Description: Over and through a light pastel blue disc, a small, caricatured brown puppy with look of supplication on face, seated on the damaged and olive-drab camouflaged tail section of a B-17 proper, and clasping forepaws in prayer, all in front of a large white cloud formation, and emitting white speed lines to rear. This emblem was inspired by the 1 February 1943 flight of the All American)

The 414th Expeditionary Reconnaissance Squadron is a provisional United States Air Force unit. It operates the General Atomics MQ-1 Predator, last known assigned to the 39th Expeditionary Operations Group, Incirlik Air Base, Turkey. The 39th Expeditionary Operations Group was part of the 39th Air Expeditionary Wing (manned by the 39th Air Base Wing). It controls the launch and landing of the Predator air vehicles.

The squadron was activated as the 24th Reconnaissance Squadron in February 1942. Shortly thereafter, it was redesignated as the 414th Bombardment Squadron. After brief training in the United States with Boeing B-17 Flying Fortress aircraft, it was one of the first heavy bomber squadrons to deploy to the European Theater of Operations. At the end of the year, following Operation Torch, the invasion of North Africa, it participated in the strategic bombing campaign against Germany from the Mediterranean Theater of Operations. It earned two Distinguished Unit Citations for its actions. Following V-E Day, it was inactivated in Italy.

The squadron was converted to provisional status under its current designation in 2011.

== Mission ==
The squadron's mission is to provide intelligence, surveillance and reconnaissance for NATO and Turkey. The squadron uses the General Atomics MQ-1 Predator, a remotely piloted aircraft that provides full-motion, high-definition video surveillance. About fifteen Air Force personnel are stationed at Incirlik Air Base, Turkey to operate the Predators. Maintenance operations were transferred to a contractor. The squadron is responsible for the launch and recovery of mission aircraft, acting as the launch and recovery element, while a mission control element operates the Reaper during its mission.

In 2011 the mission control element was located at Whiteman Air Force Base, Missouri.

== History ==
=== World War II ===
==== Organization and training ====
The squadron was activated at MacDill Field, Florida in February 1942 as the 24th Reconnaissance Squadron, one of the original squadrons of the 97th Bombardment Group. Since a reorganization of General Headquarters Air Force in September 1936, each bombardment group of the Army Air Forces (AAF) had an assigned or attached reconnaissance squadron, which operated the same aircraft as that group's assigned bombardment squadrons. The following month, it moved to Sarasota Army Air Field, Florida, where it trained with Boeing B-17 Flying Fortress aircraft and also flew antisubmarine patrols. In April, the practice of having one squadron of heavy bombardment groups designated for reconnaissance ended and the squadron became the 414th Bombardment Squadron. After a brief training period the squadron left Sarasota on 16 May.

The ground echelon sailed on the RMS Queen Elizabeth, arriving in Scotland on 10 June and at RAF Grafton Underwood, Northamptonshire, the following day. The air echelon, along with the air echelon of the 342nd Bombardment Squadron staged through Grenier Field, New Hampshire starting on 15 May. From 2 through 11 June the squadrons deployed elements to the Pacific Coast, recommencing their deployment to Great Britain via Goose Bay Airport, Labrador and Greenland to Prestwick Airport Scotland on 23 June. The squadron's B-17s began arriving at Grafton Underwood on 1 July, where they formed part of the first heavy bomber group assigned to Eighth Air Force.

==== Combat in Europe ====
===== Operations from Great Britain =====
The haste with which the squadron had trained and deployed resulted in deficiencies in its training. Most pilots had not flown at high altitudes on oxygen; some gunners had never operated a turret, much less fired at a moving target. Crews had flown together for only a few weeks in training. The squadron's first weeks in England were devoted to intensive training, with numerous specialists attending Royal Air Force (RAF) schools to prepare for combat. The squadron flew its first mission on 17 August 1942, attacking a marshalling yard at Rouen, which was also the first mission flown by AAF heavy bombers stationed in Great Britain. Two days later, the squadron supported Operation Jubilee, the raid on Dieppe, by attacking Abbeville/Drucat Airfield. It attacked naval installations, airfields and industrial and transportation targets in France and the Low Countries.

In September, the 97th Group and its squadrons were transferred to XII Bomber Command in the preparations for Operation Torch, the invasion of North Africa. However, VIII Bomber Command retained operational control of these units until they left England. The first AAF bomber groups to deploy to England had patterned their basing on that of the RAF Bomber Command, which typically had a wing with two bomber squadrons on a station. The 414th and 342nd Squadrons were at Grafton Underwood, while the 340th and 341st, along with 97th Group headquarters were at RAF Polebrook. In September, the AAF decided to follow its own organization and use larger bases that would accommodate an entire group, and the 414th and 342nd Squadrons joined the rest of the group at Polebrook.

===== Operations in the Mediterranean Theater =====
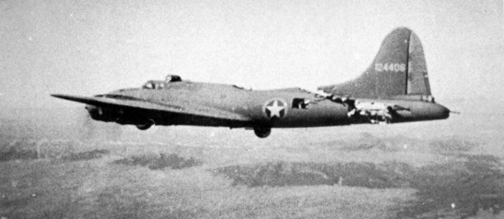
Squadron B-17F Flying Fortress All American after a collision with a German fighter (Note: Aircraft is Boeing B-17F-5-BO Flying Fortress, serial 41-24406, All American. The collision occurred on 1 February 1943 on a mission attacking the port at Tunis, Tunisia The tail section remained attached to the fuselage by a few spars and a narrow section of aluminum skin. Once back on the ground, the weight of the tail caused structural failure. The aircraft was repaired using the tail section of another salvaged B-17. The plane returned to the United States in May 1944 and was scrapped in September 1946. Baugher, Joe (26 December 2022). "1941 USAF Serial Numbers". Joe Baugher.)

Following the Operation Torch landings at Oran and Algiers on 8 November, the air echelon of the 414th left Polebrook on 18 November, staging through RAF Hurn for Maison Blanche Airport, Algeria. The ground echelon sailed by convoy to Algeria. The squadron was established at Tafaraoui Airfield, Algeria near the end of November.

Through May 1943, the squadron engaged in the campaign to cut German supply lines in North Africa by striking shipping in the Mediterranean Sea and bombing docks, harbors, airfields and marshalling yards in North Africa, Sardinia, Sicily and southern France and Italy. The squadron moved forward through Algeria and into Tunisia during these operations. In June 1943, it supported Operation Corkscrew, the projected invasion of Pantelleria, which resulted in the surrender of the island without invasion. Through the summer of 1943, it supported Operation Husky, the invasion of Sicily, and Operation Avalanche, the invasion of Italy.

From November 1943, the squadron was primarily involved with the strategic bombing campaign against Germany. The following month, it moved to Italy, pausing at Cerignola Airfield for a month before moving to Amendola Airfield, which would be its station for the remainder of the war. It bombed targets in Austria, Bulgaria, Czechoslovakia, Germany, Greece, Hungary, Romania, and Yugoslavia; striking strategic targets such as oil refineries, aircraft factories and marshalling yards. During Big Week, the intensive attacks on the German aircraft industry in February 1944, it was part of the lead formation in a strike on an aircraft manufacturing plant at Steyr, Austria. The group was awarded its first Distinguished Unit Citation for that raid. It received a second DUC for an attack on the oil refineries near Ploesti, Romania on 18 August 1944.

The group also flew air support and interdiction missions against enemy lines of communication, airfields and transportation facilities. It supported Allied forces at Anzio and Monte Cassino. It supported Operation Dragoon, the invasion of southern France, with attacks on coastal defenses. In the spring of 1945, it supported United States Fifth Army and British Eighth Army in their advance through the Po Valley.

Following V-E Day, the squadron moved to Marcianise Airfield, Italy, where it was inactivated on 29 October 1945.

=== Expeditionary operations ===
The squadron was converted to provisional status as the 414th Expeditionary Reconnaissance Squadron and assigned to United States Air Forces in Europe (USAFE) in the summer of 2011. USAFE activated it for the first time at Incirlik Air Base, Turkey in the fall. Its Predators were previously deployed in Iraq, where they flew missions surveilling elements of the Kurdistan Workers Party (PKK), which continued from Incirlik. The squadron is made up of airmen deployed from Creech and Holloman Air Force Bases. While in flight, video footage was transmitted to operators at Whiteman Air Force Base in Missouri. Squadron operations were limited to reconnaissance until July 2016, when the government of Turkey approved the use of Incirlik to conduct strike missions against ISIS in Syria in Operation Nomad Shadow. The squadron conducted the first strike against ISIS from Incirlik in support of Operation Inherent Resolve in August.

== Lineage ==
- Constituted as the 24th Reconnaissance Squadron (Heavy) on 28 January 1942

Activated on 3 February 1942
Redesignated 414th Bombardment Squadron (Heavy) on 22 April 1942
Redesignated 414th Bombardment Squadron, Heavy 30 September 1944
Inactivated on 29 October 1945

- Converted to provisional status and redesignated 414th Expeditionary Reconnaissance Squadron on 19 July 2011

Activated on 15 October 2011

=== Assignments ===
- 97th Bombardment Group, 3 February 1942 – 29 October 1945
- United States Air Forces in Europe to activate or inactivate as needed, 19 July 2011

39th Expeditionary Operations Group, 15 October 2011 – present

=== Stations ===
- MacDill Field, Florida, 3 February 1942
- Sarasota Army Air Field, Florida, 29 March 1942 – 16 May 1942
- RAF Grafton Underwood (AAF-106), England, 11 June 1942
- RAF Polebrook (AAF-110), England, 8 September 1942 (Note: Source gives date as 8 September 1943 [sic].) – 10 November 1942
- Maison Blanche Airport, Algeria, c. 19 November 1942
- Tafaraoui Airfield, Algeria, c. 22 November 1942
- Biskra Airfield, Algeria, 26 December 1942
- Chateaudun-du-Rhumel Airfield, Algeria, 8 February 1943
- Pont du Fahs Airfield, Tunisia, 12 August 1943
- Depienne Airfield, Tunisia, 14 August 1943
- Cerignola Airfield, Italy, c. 14 December 1943
- Amendola Airfield, Italy, 17 January 1944
- Marcianise Airfield, Italy, c. October 1945 – 29 October 1945
- Incirlik Air Base, Turkey, 15 October 2011 – present

=== Aircraft ===
- Boeing B-17E Flying Fortress, 1942
- Boeing B-17F Flying Fortress, 1942–1945
- General Atomics MQ-1B Predator, 2011–present

=== Awards and campaigns ===
Award streamer	Award	Dates	Notes
	Distinguished Unit Citation	24 February 1944	Steyr, Austria 414th Bombardment Squadron
	Distinguished Unit Citation	18 August 1944	Ploesti, Romania 414th Bombardment Squadron
	Air Force Meritorious Unit Award	1 January 2016–31 December 2016	414th Expeditionary Reconnaissance Squadron

Campaign Streamer	Campaign	Dates	Notes
	Antisubmarine	3 February 1942 – 16 May 1942	24th Reconnaissance Squadron (later 414th Bombardment Squadron)
	Air Combat, EAME Theater	11 June 1942 – 11 May 1945	414th Bombardment Squadron
	Air Offensive, Europe	4 July 1942 – 5 June 1944	414th Bombardment Squadron
	Egypt-Libya	c. 19 November 1942 – 12 February 1943	414th Bombardment Squadron
	Tunisia	c. 19 November 1942 – 13 May 1943	414th Bombardment Squadron
	Sicily	14 May 1943 – 17 August 1943	414th Bombardment Squadron
	Naples-Foggia	18 August 1943 – 21 January 1944	414th Bombardment Squadron
	Anzio	22 January 1944 – 24 May 1944	414th Bombardment Squadron
	Rome-Arno	22 January 1944 – 9 September 1944	414th Bombardment Squadron
	Central Europe	22 March 1944 – 21 May 1945	414th Bombardment Squadron
	Normandy	6 June 1944 – 24 July 1944	414th Bombardment Squadron
	Northern France	25 July 1944 – 14 September 1944	414th Bombardment Squadron
	Southern France	15 August 1944 – 14 September 1944	414th Bombardment Squadron
	North Apennines	10 September 1944 – 4 April 1945	414th Bombardment Squadron
	Rhineland	15 September 1944 – 21 March 1945	414th Bombardment Squadron
	Po Valley	3 April 1945 – 8 May 1945	414th Bombardment Squadron

== See also ==
- Boeing B-17 Flying Fortress Units of the Mediterranean Theater of Operations
- List of United States Air Force reconnaissance squadrons
