= 342d Bombardment Squadron =

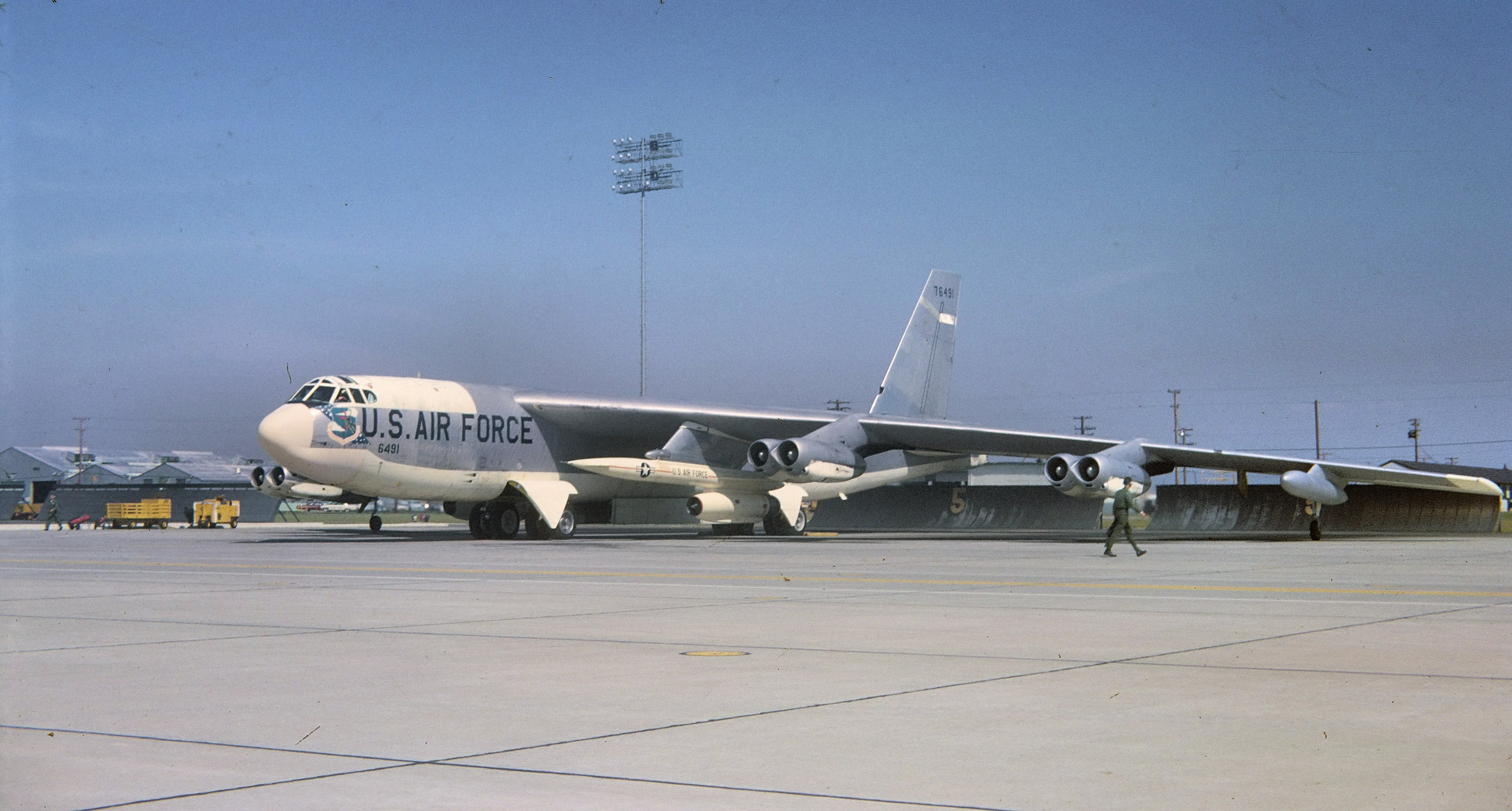
- B-52G Stratofortressin the early 1960s (Note: Aircraft is Boeing B-52G-85-BW Stratofortress, serial 57–6491 at Beale Air Force Base.)
- Active: 1942–1945; 1946–1963
- Country: United States
- Branch: United States Air Force
- Role: Bombardment
- Engagements: European Theater of Operations; Mediterranean Theater of Operations
- Decorations: Distinguished Unit Citation; Air Force Outstanding Unit Award

Insignia
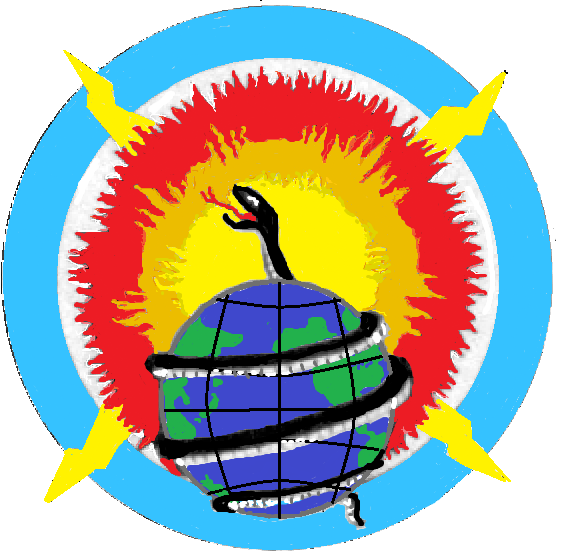
- 342d Bombardment Squadron emblem (Note: Approved 9 November 1951. Description: On a disc white, edged light blue, over two lightning flashes crossed, yellow, extending over the edge of the border, a stylized sunburst yellow, orange, and red, over all and in base, a sphere proper, entwined with a serpent black and white, head upward to right (dexter).)

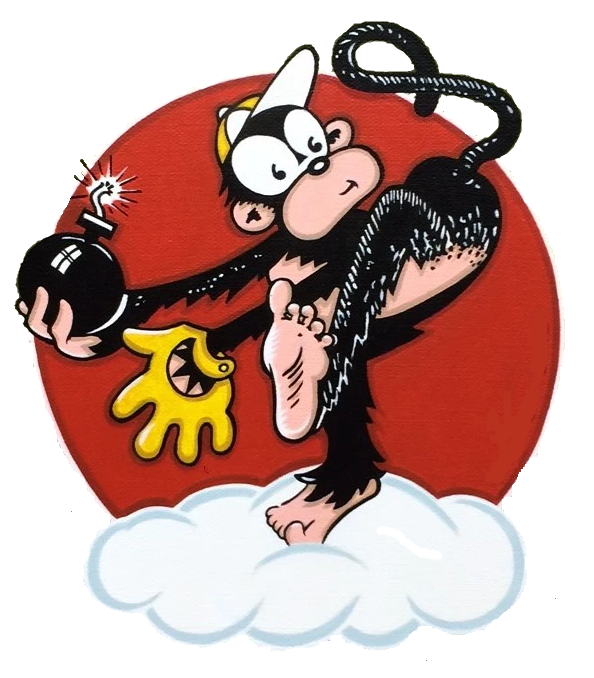
- 342d Bombardment Squadron emblem (World War II Europe) (Note: The squadron replaced its original emblem on deploying to the United Kingdom. Watkins, pp. 72-73.)

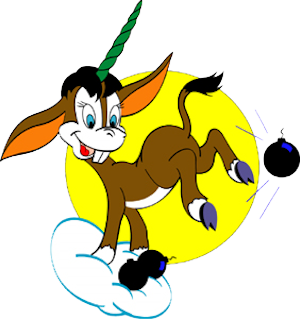
- 342d Bombardment Squadron emblem (World War II US) (Note: This emblem was designed for the squadron while it was training, but was rejected as not being fierce enough. The proposed replacement was also rejected. Watkins, pp.72-73.)

The 342d Bombardment Squadron is an inactive United States Air Force unit. It was last assigned to the 4137th Strategic Wing at Robins Air Force Base, Georgia, where it was inactivated on 1 February 1963.

The squadron was activated in February 1942. After brief training in the United States with Boeing B-17 Flying Fortress aircraft, it was one of the first heavy bomber squadrons to deploy to the European Theater of Operations. At the end of the year, following Operation Torch, the invasion of North Africa, it participated in the strategic bombing campaign against Germany from the Mediterranean Theater of Operations. It earned two Distinguished Unit Citations for its actions. Following V-E Day, it was inactivated in Italy.

The squadron was again activated in August 1946 as a Strategic Air Command (SAC) bomber squadron, when it took over the personnel and equipment of another squadron, which was inactivated. It stood ground alert both overseas and in the United States from 1958 and airborne alert after 1961. During the Cuban Missile Crisis, it placed all its bombers on alert. It continued to operate medium and heavy bombers under SAC until February 1963, when it was inactivated and its mission, personnel, and equipment transferred to another unit.

== History ==
=== World War II ===
==== Organization and training ====
The squadron was activated at MacDill Field, Florida in February 1942, one of the original squadrons of the 97th Bombardment Group. The following month, it moved to Sarasota Army Air Field, Florida, where it trained with Boeing B-17 Flying Fortress aircraft and also flew antisubmarine patrols. After a brief training period the squadron left Sarasota on 16 May.

The ground echelon sailed on the RMS Queen Elizabeth, arriving in Scotland on 10 June and at RAF Grafton Underwood, Northamptonshire, the following day. The air echelon, along with the air echelon of the 414th Bombardment Squadron staged through Grenier Field, New Hampshire starting on 15 May. From 2 through 11 June the squadrons deployed elements to the Pacific Coast, recommencing their deployment to Great Britain via Goose Bay Airport, Labrador and Greenland to Prestwick Airport Scotland on 23 June. The squadron's B-17s began arriving at Grafton Underwood on 1 July, where they formed part of the first heavy bomber group assigned to Eighth Air Force.

==== Combat in Europe ====
===== Operations from Great Britain =====
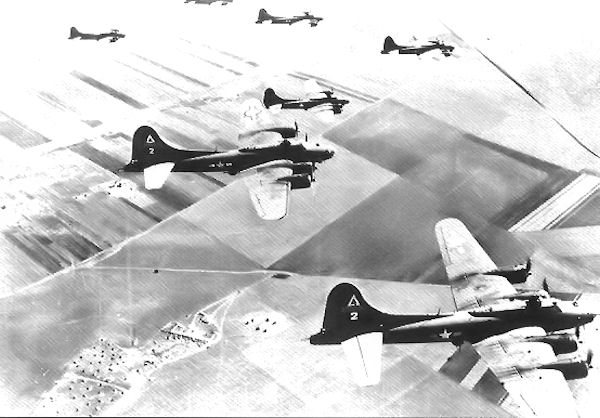
Squadron B-17F aircraft attacking enemy targets at Anzio in January 1944 (Note: Boeing B-17F-85-BO Flying Fortress, serial 42-30056 is in foreground. This plane was shot down on 2 July 1944 in an attack on an oil refinery in Hungary. Missing Air Crew Report 6338.)

The haste with which the squadron had trained and deployed resulted in deficiencies in its training. Most pilots had not flown at high altitudes on oxygen; some gunners had never operated a turret, much less fired at a moving target. Crews had flown together for only a few weeks in training. The squadron's first weeks in England were devoted to intensive training, with numerous specialists attending Royal Air Force (RAF) schools to prepare for combat. The squadron flew its first mission on 17 August 1942, attacking a marshalling yard at Rouen, which was also the first mission flown by AAF heavy bombers stationed in Great Britain. Two days later, the squadron supported Operation Jubilee, the raid on Dieppe, by attacking Abbeville/Drucat Airfield. It attacked naval installations, airfields and industrial and transportation targets in France and the Low Countries.

In September, the 97th Group and its squadrons were transferred to XII Bomber Command in the preparations for Operation Torch, the invasion of North Africa. However, VIII Bomber Command retained operational control of these units until they left England. The first AAF bomber groups to deploy to England had patterned their basing on that of the RAF Bomber Command, which typically had a wing with two bomber squadrons on a station. The 414th and 342nd Squadrons were at Grafton Underwood, while the 340th and 341st, along with 97th Group headquarters were at RAF Polebrook. In September, the AAF decided to follow its own organization and use larger bases that would accommodate an entire group, and the 414th and 342nd Squadrons joined the rest of the group at Polebrook.

===== Operations in the Mediterranean Theater =====
Following the Operation Torch landings at Oran and Algiers on 8 November, the air echelon of the 342d left Polebrook on 18 November, staging through RAF Hurn for Maison Blanche Airport, Algeria. The ground echelon sailed by convoy to Algeria. The squadron was established at Tafaraoui Airfield, Algeria near the end of November.

Through May 1943, the squadron engaged in the campaign to cut German supply lines in North Africa by striking shipping in the Mediterranean Sea and bombing docks, harbors, airfields and marshalling yards in North Africa, Sardinia, Sicily and southern France and Italy. The squadron moved forward through Algeria and into Tunisia during these operations. In June 1943, it supported Operation Corkscrew, the projected invasion of Pantelleria, which resulted in the surrender of the island without invasion. Through the summer of 1943, it supported Operation Husky, the invasion of Sicily, and Operation Avalanche, the invasion of Italy.

From November 1943, the squadron was primarily involved with the strategic bombing campaign against Germany. The following month, it moved to Italy, pausing at Cerignola Airfield for a month before moving to Amendola Airfield, which would be its station for the remainder of the war. It bombed targets in Austria, Bulgaria, Czechoslovakia, Germany, Greece, Hungary, Romania, and Yugoslavia; striking strategic targets such as oil refineries, aircraft factories and marshalling yards. During Big Week, the intensive attacks on the German aircraft industry in February 1944, it was part of the lead formation on a strike on an aircraft manufacturing plant at Steyr, Austria, for which it was awarded its first Distinguished Unit Citation. It received a second DUC for an attack on the oil refineries near Ploesti, Romania on 18 August 1944.

The group also flew air support and interdiction missions against enemy lines of communication, airfields and transportation facilities. It supported Allied forces at Anzio and Monte Cassino. It supported Operation Dragoon, the invasion of southern France, with attacks on coastal defenses. In the spring of 1945, it supported United States Fifth Army and British Eighth Army in their advance through the Po Valley.

Following V-E Day, the squadron moved to Marcianise Airfield, Italy, where it was inactivated on 29 October 1945.

=== Strategic Air Command ===
==== Superfortress operations ====
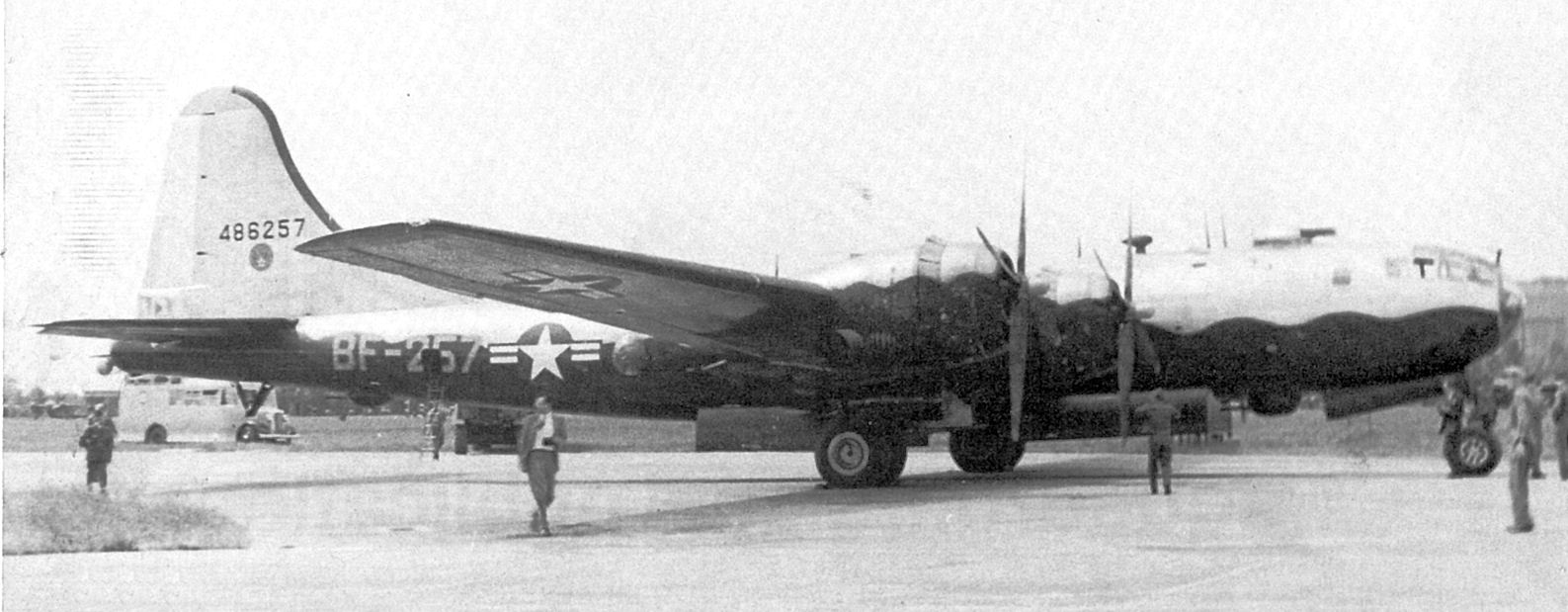
97th Wing B-29 deployed to England in 1950 (Note: Aircraft is Martin Aircraft built Boeing B-29-40-MO Superfortress, serial 44-86257.)

The squadron was reactivated at Smoky Hill Army Air Field, Kansas in August 1946, where it took over the personnel and Boeing B-29 Superfortresses of the 829th Bombardment Squadron, which was simultaneously inactivated. The squadron deployed to Eielson Air Force Base, Alaska in November 1947 and flew training missions over the Arctic Ocean until March 1948, when it returned to Kansas. Two months later, the squadron moved to Biggs Air Force Base, Texas.

In 1950, the 342d upgraded to the improved Boeing B-50 Superfortress. It deployed along with all operational elements of the 97th Bombardment Wing to RAF Sculthorpe from July to October 1950 and to RAF Lakenheath from March to June 1952. From 1952 to 1954, squadrons of the 97th Wing kept deployed elements on Andersen Air Force Base, Guam.

Strategic Air Command (SAC)’s mobilization for the Korean War highlighted that SAC wing commanders focused too much on running the base organization and not spending enough time on overseeing actual combat preparations. To allow wing commanders the ability to focus on combat operations, the air base group commander became responsible for managing the base housekeeping functions. Under the plan implemented in February 1951 and finalized in June 1952, the wing commander focused primarily on the combat units and the maintenance necessary to support combat aircraft by having the combat and maintenance squadrons report directly to the wing and eliminating the intermediate group structures. With this reorganization, the squadron now reported directly to the 97th Bombardment Wing.

==== Stratojet operations ====
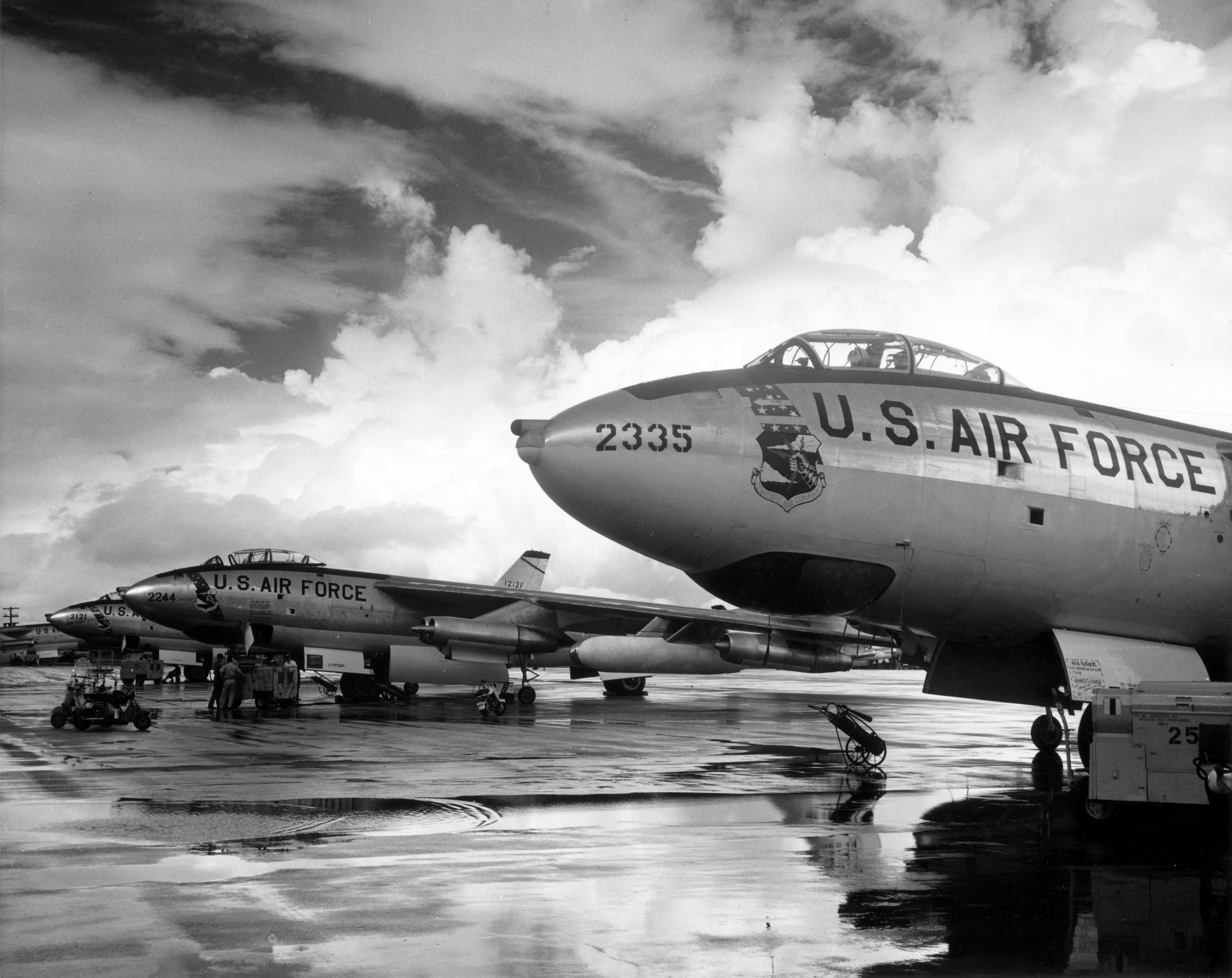
SAC B-47s on the flight line

In 1955, the squadron converted to the Boeing B-47 Stratojet jet bomber. It deployed to RAF Upper Heyford from May to July 1956 in what was to be the last deployment of the full 97th Wing.

The squadron participated in Operation Reflex, which placed Stratojets and Boeing KC-97 Stratofreighters at overseas bases closer to the Soviet Union for 90 day periods, although individuals rotated back to home bases during unit Reflex deployments The percentage of SAC planes on alert gradually grew over the next three years to reach its goal of 1/3 of SAC’s force on alert by 1960. From 1958, B-47s began to assume an alert posture at their home bases, reducing the amount of time spent on alert at overseas bases. General Thomas S. Power set a final goal of maintaining one half of SAC's planes on fifteen minute ground alert, fully fueled and ready for combat to reduce vulnerability to a Soviet missile strike.

The squadron phased down for inactivation in December 1958 and became nonoperational in January 1959. In July 1959 it moved to Blytheville Air Force Base, but remained nonoperational.

==== Stratofortress operations ====
At Blytheville, the 342d began to equip with Boeing B-52G Stratofortress strategic bombers in late 1959. However, large concentrations of bombers, like the 45 B-52s of the 97th Wing at Blytheville, made attractive targets for an enemy strike. SAC decided to disperse its B-52 force to smaller wings with 15 bombers at other bases. This not only complicated Soviet targeting planning, but with more runways, it would take less time to launch the bomber force. Implementing this program, the squadron moved to Robins Air Force Base, Georgia, where it became part of the 4137th Strategic Wing.

By 1962, half of the squadron's aircraft were on alert. SAC planners were looking into additional methods to protect their forces in addition to the ground alert program. In January 1961, SAC disclosed it was maintaining an airborne force for "airborne alert training" in Operation Chrome Dome. In January 1962, the squadron was one of the first five in SAC to carry GAM-72 Quail decoy missiles aboard its airborne alert aircraft

Soon after detection of Soviet missiles in Cuba in October 1962, SAC brought all its degraded and adjusted alert sorties up to full capability. On 20 October the squadron was directed to put two additional planes on alert. On 22 October, 1/8 of the squadron's B-52s were placed on airborne alert. On 24 October SAC went to DEFCON 2, placing all squadron aircraft on alert. As tensions eased, on 21 November SAC went to DEFCON 3 and returned to its normal airborne alert posture. On 27 November the squadron returned to its normal ground alert posture.

Later in 1962, in order to perpetuate the lineage of currently inactive bombardment units with illustrious World War II records, SAC received authority from Headquarters USAF to discontinue its Major Command controlled (MAJCON) strategic wings controlling combat squadrons, which could not carry a permanent history or lineage, and to activate Air Force controlled (AFCON) units to replace them, time which could carry a lineage and history. As a result, the 4137th was replaced by the 465th Bombardment Wing. In this reorganization, the squadron inactivated and transferred its mission, personnel, and equipment to the 781st Bombardment Squadron, which was simultaneously organized, on 1 February 1963.

== Lineage ==
- Constituted as the 342d Bombardment Squadron (Heavy) on 28 January 1942

Activated on 3 February 1942
Redesignated 342d Bombardment Squadron, Heavy on 30 September 1944
Inactivated on 29 October 1945
Redesignated 342d Bombardment Squadron, Very Heavy on 15 July 1946
Activated on 4 August 1946
Redesignated 342d Bombardment Squadron, Medium on 28 May 1948
Redesignated 342d Bombardment Squadron, Heavy on 1 October 1959
Discontinued and inactivated on 1 February 1963

=== Assignments ===
- 97th Bombardment Group, 3 February 1942 – 29 October 1945
- 97th Bombardment Group, 4 August 1946 (attached to 97th Bombardment Wing after 10 February 1951)
- 97th Bombardment Wing, 16 June 1952
- 4137th Strategic Wing, 15 May 1960 – 1 February 1963

=== Stations ===
- MacDill Field, Florida, 3 February 1942
- Sarasota Army Air Field, Florida, 29 March 1942 – 16 May 1942
- RAF Grafton Underwood (AAF Station 106), England, 9 June 1942
- RAF Polebrook (AAF Station 110), England, 8 September 1942
- Maison Blanche Airport, Algeria, c. 19 November 1942
- Tafaraoui Airfield, Algeria, c. 22 November 1942
- Biskra Airfield, Algeria, 27 December 1942
- Chateaudun-du-Rhumel Airfield, Algeria, 18 February 1943
- Pont du Fahs Airfield, Tunisia, 10 August 1943
- Depienne Airfield, Tunisia, 14 August 1943
- Cerignola Airfield, Italy, c. 9 December 1943
- Amendola Airfield, Italy, 16 January 1944
- Marcianise Airfield, Italy, c. 1 October 1945 – 29 October 1945
- Smoky Hill Army Air Field (later Smoky Hill Air Force Base), Kansas, 4 August 1946
- Biggs Air Force Base, Texas, 18 May 1948
- Blytheville Air Force Base, Arkansas, 1 July 1959
- Robins Air Force Base, Georgia, 15 May 1960 – 1 February 1963

=== Aircraft ===
- Boeing B-17 Flying Fortress, 1942–1945
- Boeing B-29 Superfortress, 1946–1950
- Boeing B-50 Superfortress, 1950–1955
- Boeing B-47 Stratojet, 1955–1959
- Boeing B-52G Stratofortress, 1960–1963

=== Awards and campaigns ===
Award streamer	Award	Dates	Notes
	Distinguished Unit Citation	24 February 1944	Steyr, Austria
	Distinguished Unit Citation	18 August 1944	Ploesti, Romania
	Air Force Outstanding Unit Award	2 July-3 November 1957	

Campaign Streamer	Campaign	Dates	Notes
	Antisubmarine	29 March 1942–16 May 1942	
	Air Combat, EAME Theater	11 June 1942–11 May 1945	
	Air Offensive, Europe	4 July 1942–5 June 1944	
	Egypt-Libya	13 November 1942–12 February 1943	
	Naples-Foggia	18 August 1943–21 January 1944	
	Anzio	22 January 1944–24 May 1944	
	Rome-Arno	22 January 1944–9 September 1944	
	Central Europe	22 March 1944–21 May 1945	
	Normandy	6 June 1944–24 July 1944	
	Northern France	25 July 1944–14 September 1944	
	Southern France	15 August 1944–14 September 1944	
	North Apennines	10 September 1944–4 April 1945	
	Rhineland	15 September 1944–21 March 1945	
	Po Valley	3 April 1945–8 May 1945	

== See also ==
- Boeing B-17 Flying Fortress Units of the Mediterranean Theater of Operations
- List of B-52 Units of the United States Air Force
- List of B-29 Superfortress operators
- List of B-50 units of the United States Air Force
- List of B-47 units of the United States Air Force
