= 341st Bombardment Squadron =

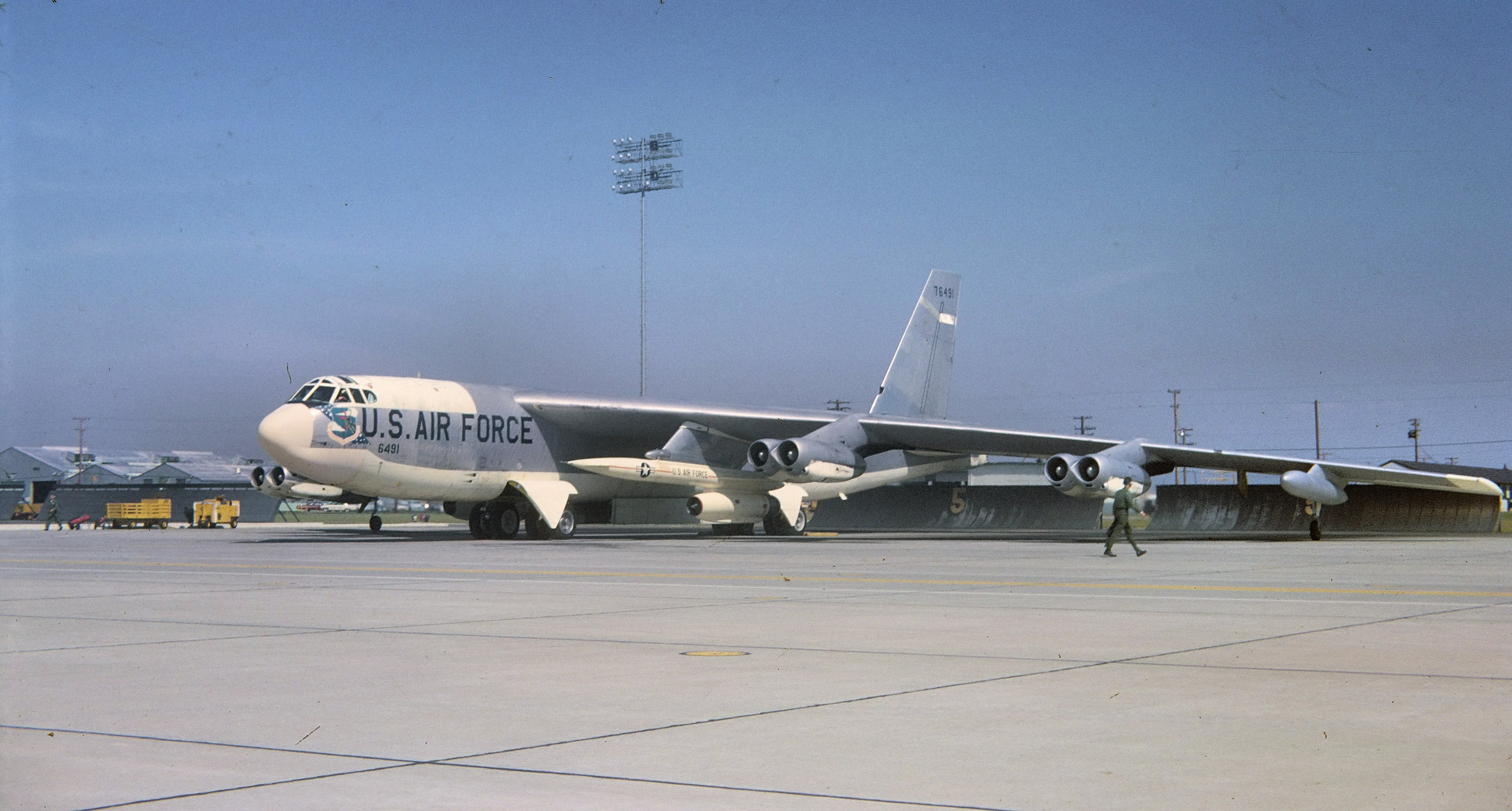
- Boeing B-52G Stratofortress in early 1960s SAC markings (Note: Aircraft is Boeing B-52G-85-BW Stratofortress, serial 57–6491 at Beale Air Force Base.)
- Active: 1942–1945; 1946–1963
- Country: United States
- Branch: United States Air Force
- Role: Heavy bomber
- Engagements: European Theater of Operations
- Decorations: Distinguished Unit Citation; Air Force Outstanding Unit Award

Insignia
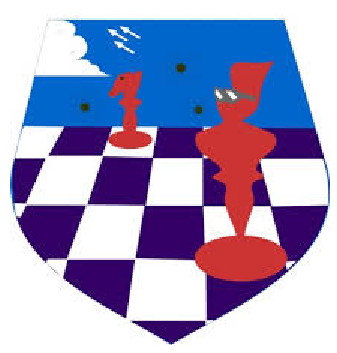
- 341st Bombardment Squadron emblem (Note: Approved 6 August 1957. Description: On a shield of a chessboard in perspective, medium blue and white, a chief of light blue sky, over all in sinister, a chess knight wearing jet helmet with winged plume and white goggles, details black, and in dexter, a castle (or rook) and a true chess knight, all red; in chief a white cloud issuing from the dexter, three fissionable flowers, orbits black, nuclei red, electrons white, and three white futuristic bombers in formation, outlines and details black throughout.)

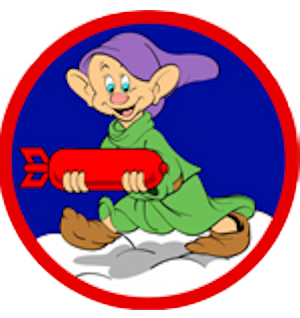
- 341st Bombardment Squadron emblem(World War II) (Note: The emblem depicts Dopey, one of the Seven Dwarfs from Walt Disney's Snow White and the Seven Dwarfs)

The 341st Bombardment Squadron is an inactive United States Air Force unit. It was last assigned to the 4038th Strategic Wing at Dow Air Force Base, Maine, where it was inactivated on 1 February 1963.

The squadron was first activated in 1942 as a Boeing B-17 Flying Fortress squadron, assigned to the 97th Bombardment Group. After training in the United States, it was one of the first units to deploy to the European Theater of Operations. Following the invasion of North Africa, the squadron moved to the Mediterranean Theater of Operations, where it earned two Distinguished Unit Citations. Following V-E Day, it returned to the United States and was inactivated.

The squadron was again activated as an element of Strategic Air Command in 1946. It deployed to the United Kingdom during the Berlin Airlift in show of force. It stood ground alert both overseas and in the United States from 1958 and airborne alert after 1961. During the Cuban Missile Crisis, it placed all its bombers on alert.

== History ==
=== World War II ===
==== Organization and training ====
The squadron was activated at MacDill Field, Florida in February 1942, one of the original squadrons of the 97th Bombardment Group. The following month, it moved to Sarasota Army Air Field, Florida, where it trained with Boeing B-17 Flying Fortress aircraft and also flew antisubmarine patrols. After a brief training period the squadron left Sarasota on 16 May.

The ground echelon sailed on the RMS Queen Elizabeth, arriving in Scotland on 10 June and at RAF Polebrook two days later. The air echelon, along with the air echelon of the 340th Bombardment Squadron staged through Dow Field, Maine starting on 15 May. From 2 through 11 June the squadrons deployed elements to the Pacific Coast, recommencing their deployment to Great Britain via Goose Bay Airport, Labrador and Greenland to Prestwick Airport Scotland on 23 June. The squadron's B-17s began arriving at Polebrook on 1 July, where they formed part of the first heavy bomber group assigned to Eighth Air Force.

==== Combat in Europe ====
===== Operations from Great Britain =====
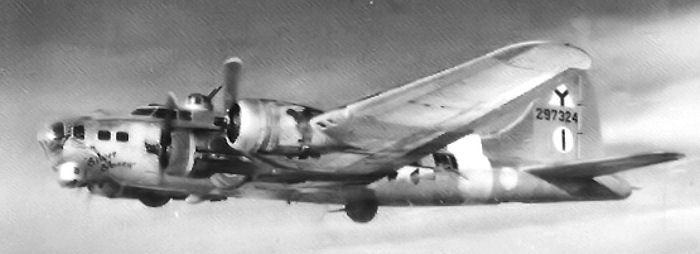
Squadron B-17G Flying Fortress (Note: Aircraft is Boeing B-17G-45-BO Flying Fortress, serial 42-97324 Silver Sheen. It was assigned to the squadron on 18 October 1944 and flew combat missions until being shot down by Messerschmitt Me 262 jet fighters during an attack on the Braunkohle-Benzin AG synthetic oil refinery at Schwarzheide, Germany on 22 March 1945. Baugher, Joe (7 March 2023). "1942 USAF Serial Numbers". Joe Baugher.)

The haste with which the squadron had trained and deployed resulted in deficiencies in its training. Most pilots had not flown at high altitudes on oxygen; some gunners had never operated a turret, much less fired at a moving target. Crews had flown together for only a few weeks in training. The squadron's first weeks in England were devoted to intensive training, with numerous specialists attending Royal Air Force (RAF) schools to prepare for combat. The squadron flew its first mission on 17 August 1942, attacking a marshalling yard at Rouen, which was also the first mission flown by AAF heavy bombers stationed in Great Britain. Two days later, the squadron supported Operation Jubilee, the raid on Dieppe, by attacking Abbeville/Drucat Airfield. It attacked naval installations, airfields and industrial and transportation targets in France and the Low Countries.

In September, the 97th Group and its squadrons were transferred to XII Bomber Command in the preparations for Operation Torch, the invasion of North Africa. However, VIII Bomber Command retained operational control of these units until they left England. The first AAF bomber groups to deploy to England had patterned their basing on that of the RAF Bomber Command, which typically had a wing with two bomber squadrons on a station. The 97th Group's 342nd and 414th Squadrons were at RAF Grafton Underwood, while 97th Group headquarters, the 340th and the 341st Squadrons were at Polebrook. In September, the AAF decided to follow its own organization and use larger bases that would accommodate an entire group, and the 414th and 342nd Squadrons joined the rest of the group at Polebrook.

===== Operations in the Mediterranean Theater =====
Following the Operation Torch landings at Oran and Algiers on 8 November, the air echelon of the 341st left Polebrook on 18 November, staging through RAF Hurn for Maison Blanche Airport, Algeria. The ground echelon sailed by convoy to Algeria. The squadron was established at Tafaraoui Airfield, Algeria near the end of November.

Through May 1943, the squadron engaged in the campaign to cut German supply lines in North Africa by striking shipping in the Mediterranean Sea and bombing docks, harbors, airfields and marshalling yards in North Africa, Sardinia, Sicily and southern France and Italy. The squadron moved forward through Algeria and into Tunisia during these operations. In June 1943, it supported Operation Corkscrew, the projected invasion of Pantelleria, which resulted in the surrender of the island without invasion. Through the summer of 1943, it supported Operation Husky, the invasion of Sicily, and Operation Avalanche, the invasion of Italy.

From November 1943, the squadron was primarily involved with the strategic bombing campaign against Germany. The following month, it moved to Italy, pausing at Cerignola Airfield for a month before moving to Amendola Airfield, which would be its station for the remainder of the war. It bombed targets in Austria, Bulgaria, Czechoslovakia, Germany, Greece, Hungary, Romania, and Yugoslavia; striking strategic targets such as oil refineries, aircraft factories and marshalling yards. During Big Week, the intensive attacks on the German aircraft industry in February 1944, it was part of the lead formation on a strike on an aircraft manufacturing plant at Steyr, Austria, for which it was awarded its first Distinguished Unit Citation. It received a second DUC for an attack on the oil refineries near Ploesti, Romania on 18 August 1944.

The group also flew air support and interdiction missions against enemy lines of communication, airfields and transportation facilities. It supported Allied forces at Anzio and Monte Cassino. It supported Operation Dragoon, the invasion of southern France, with attacks on coastal defenses. In the spring of 1945, it supported United States Fifth Army and British Eighth Army in their advance through the Po Valley.

Following V-E Day, the squadron moved to Marcianise Airfield, Italy, where it was inactivated on 29 October 1945.

==== Medal of Honor ====
On 23 June 1944, in an attack on Ploesti, Lieutenant David R. Kingsley was serving as bombardier on a squadron B-17. Lt Kingsley's plane was severely damaged and the tail gunner was injured and his parachute had been damaged. The pilot gave the order for the crew to bail out of the damaged plane. Lt Kinsley assisted the wounded gunner to bail out, giving the gunner his own parachute. Moments later, the bomber crashed and burned, killing Lt Kingsley. Kingsley Field Air National Guard Base at Klamath Falls, Oregon it named after him.

=== Strategic Air Command ===
==== Superfortress operations ====
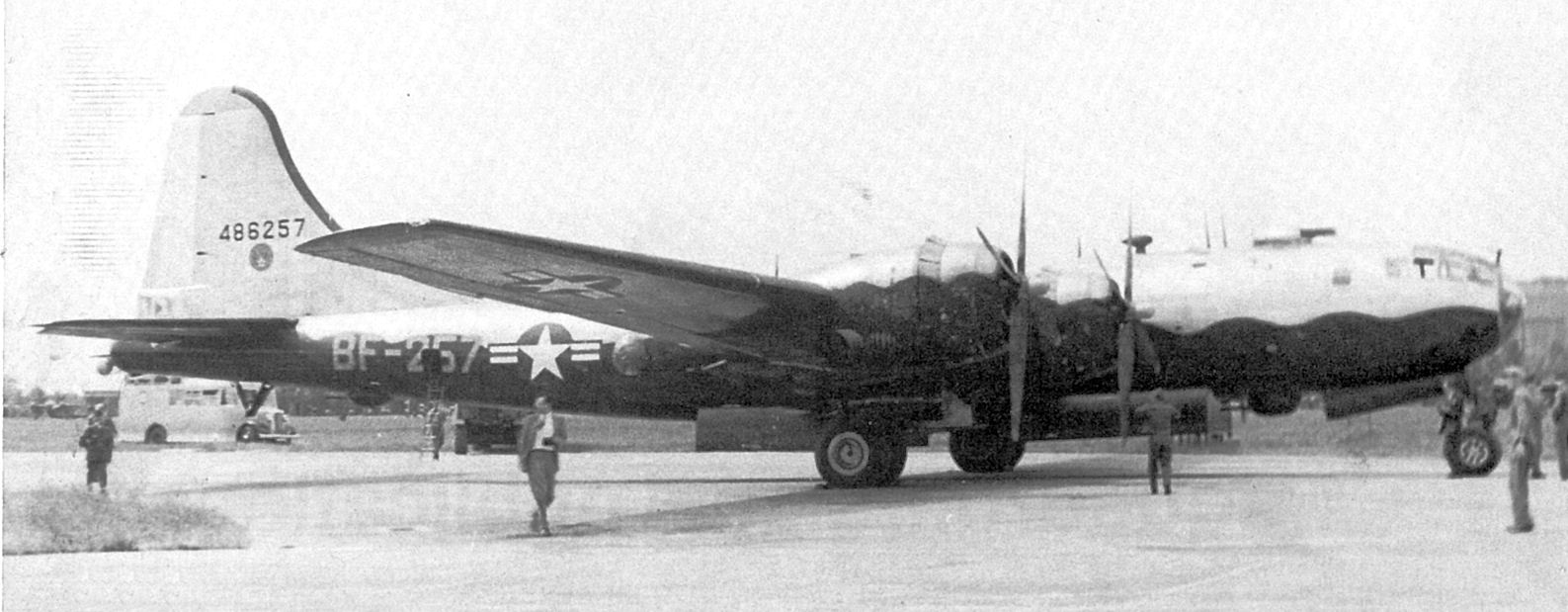
97th Wing B-29 deployed to England in 1950 (Note: Aircraft is Martin Aircraft built Boeing B-29-40-MO Superfortress, serial 44-86257.)

The squadron was reactivated at Smoky Hill Army Air Field, Kansas in August 1946, where it took over the personnel and Boeing B-29 Superfortresses of the 828th Bombardment Squadron, which was simultaneously inactivated. The squadron deployed to Eielson Air Force Base, Alaska in November 1947 and flew training missions over the Arctic Ocean until March 1948, when it returned to Kansas. Two months later, the squadron moved to Biggs Air Force Base, Texas. In November 1948, the squadron, along with its sister squadron, the 340th Bombardment Squadron, deployed to RAF Marham in a show of force during the Berlin Blockade, remaining there until February 1949. The squadron relieved the B-29s of the 307th Bombardment Group, which had deployed in July 1948. Although the Soviets did not know it at the time, the deployed B-29s did not have a nuclear capability. Only the B-29s of the 509th Bombardment Group were nuclear capable at the time.

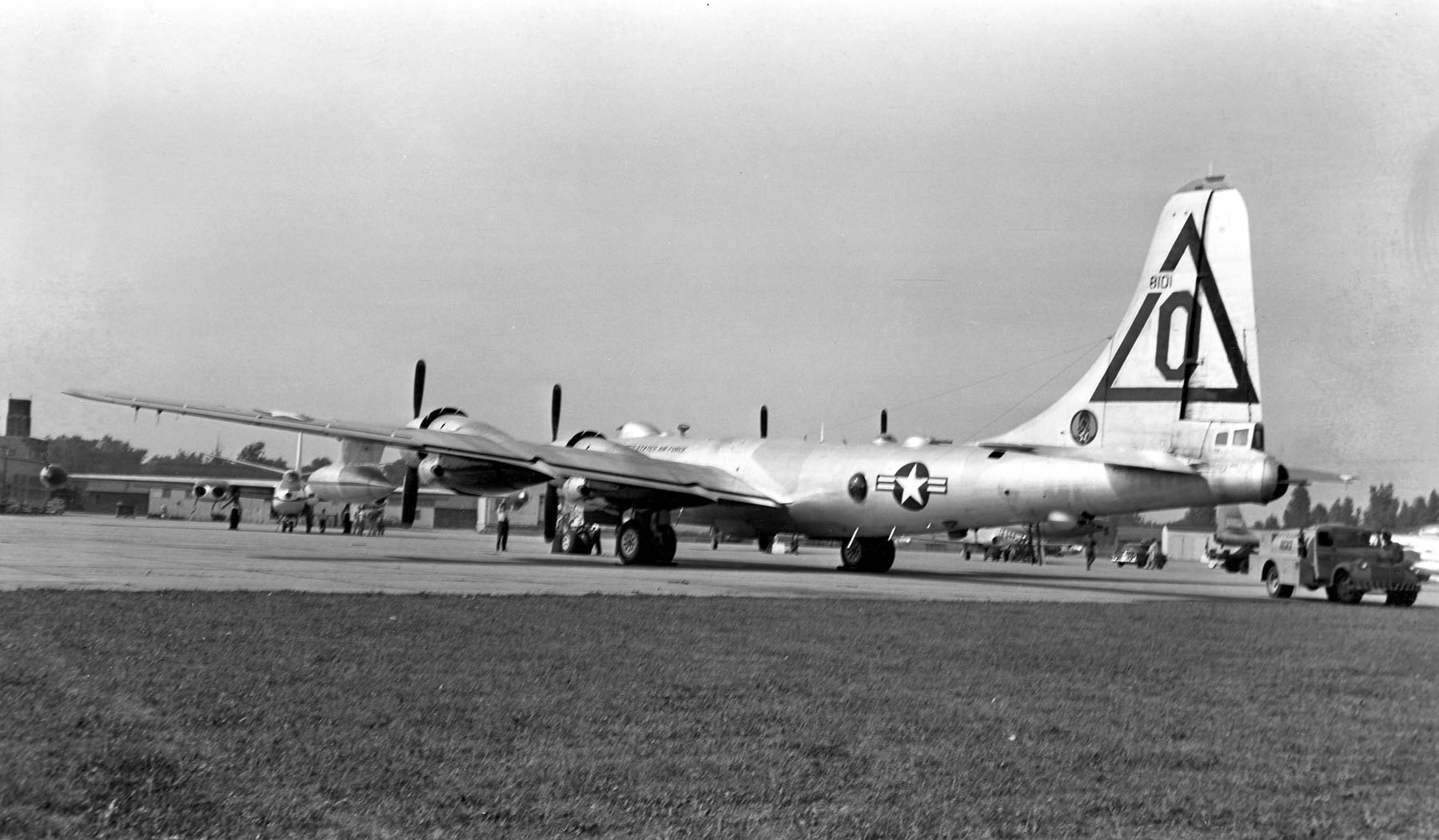
97th Wing B-50 at Biggs AFB (Note: Aircraft is Boeing B-50D-100-BO Superfortress, serial 48-101.)

In 1950, the 341st upgraded to the improved Boeing B-50 Superfortress. It deployed along with all operational elements of the 97th Bombardment Wing to RAF Sculthorpe from July to October 1950 and to RAF Lakenheath from March to June 1952. From 1952 to 1954, squadrons of the 97th Wing kept deployed elements on Andersen Air Force Base, Guam.

Strategic Air Command (SAC)’s mobilization for the Korean War highlighted that SAC wing commanders focused too much on running the base organization and not spending enough time on overseeing actual combat preparations. To allow wing commanders the ability to focus on combat operations, the air base group commander became responsible for managing the base housekeeping functions. Under the plan implemented in February 1951 and finalized in June 1952, the wing commander focused primarily on the combat units and the maintenance necessary to support combat aircraft by having the combat and maintenance squadrons report directly to the wing and eliminating the intermediate group structures. With this reorganization, the squadron now reported directly to the 97th Bombardment Wing.

==== Stratojet operations ====
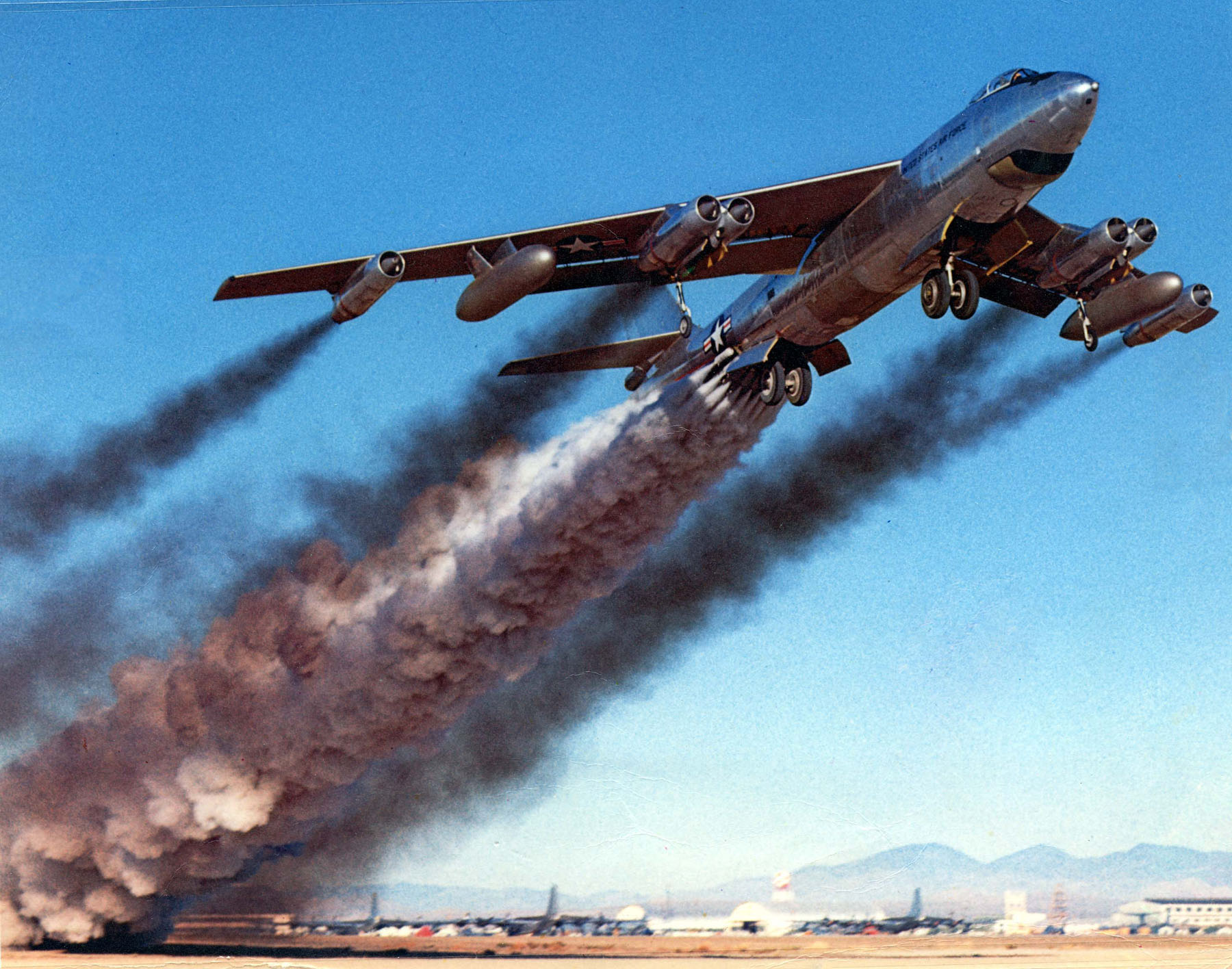
Rocket-assisted take-off of a Boeing B-47

In 1955, the squadron converted to the Boeing B-47 Stratojet jet bomber. It deployed to RAF Upper Heyford from May to July 1956 in what was to be the last deployment of the full 97th Wing.

The squadron participated in Operation Reflex, which placed Stratojets and Boeing KC-97s at overseas bases closer to the Soviet Union for 90 day periods, although individuals rotated back to home bases during unit Reflex deployments The percentage of SAC planes on alert gradually grew over the next three years to reach its goal of 1/3 of SAC’s force on alert by 1960. From 1958, B-47s began to assume an alert posture at their home bases, reducing the amount of time spent on alert at overseas bases. General Thomas S. Power set a final goal of maintaining one half of SAC's planes on fifteen minute ground alert, fully fueled and ready for combat to reduce vulnerability to a Soviet missile strike.

The squadron phased down for inactivation in December 1958 and became nonoperational in January 1959. In July 1959 it moved to Blytheville Air Force Base, but remained nonoperational.

==== Stratofortress operations ====
At Blytheville, the 341st began to equip with Boeing B-52G Stratofortress strategic bombers in late 1959. However, large concentrations of bombers, like the 45 B-52s of the 97th Wing at Blytheville, made attractive targets for an enemy strike. SAC decided to disperse its B-52 force to smaller wings with 15 bombers at other bases. This not only complicated Soviet targeting planning, but with more runways, it would take less time to launch the bomber force. Implementing this program, the squadron moved to Dow Air Force Base, Maine, where it became part of the 4038th Strategic Wing.

By 1962, half The squadron's aircraft were on alert. SAC planners were looking into additional methods to protect their forces in addition to the ground alert program. In January 1961, SAC disclosed it was maintaining an airborne force for "airborne alert training" in Operation Chrome Dome. In January 1962, the squadron was one of the first five in SAC to carry GAM-72 Quail decoy missiles aboard its airborne alert aircraft

Soon after detection of Soviet missiles in Cuba in October 1962, SAC brought all its degraded and adjusted alert sorties up to full capability. On 20 October the squadron was directed to put two additional planes on alert. On 22 October, 1/8 of the squadron's B-52s were placed on airborne alert. On 24 October SAC went to DEFCON 2, placing all squadron aircraft on alert. As tensions eased, on 21 November SAC went to DEFCON 3 and returned to its normal airborne alert posture. On 27 November the squadron returned to its normal ground alert posture.

Later in 1962, in order to perpetuate the lineage of currently inactive bombardment units with illustrious World War II records, SAC received authority from Headquarters USAF to discontinue its Major Command controlled (MAJCON) strategic wings controlling combat squadrons, which could not carry a permanent history or lineage, and to activate Air Force controlled (AFCON) units to replace them, time which could carry a lineage and history. As a result, the 4038th was replaced by the 397th Bombardment Wing. In this reorganization, the squadron inactivated and transferred its mission, personnel, and equipment to the 596th Bombardment Squadron, which was simultaneously organized, on 1 February 1963.

== Lineage ==
- Constituted as the 341st Bombardment Squadron (Heavy) on 28 January 1942

Activated on 3 February 1942
Redesignated 341st Bombardment Squadron, Heavy c. 6 March 1944
Inactivated on 29 October 1945

- Redesignated 341st Bombardment Squadron, Very Heavy on 15 July 1946

Activated on 4 August 1946
Redesignated 341st Bombardment Squadron, Medium on 28 May 1948
Redesignated: 341st Bombardment Squadron, Heavy on 1 October 1959
Discontinued and inactivated on 1 February 1963

=== Assignments ===
- 97th Bombardment Group, 3 February 1942 – 29 October 1945
- 97th Bombardment Group, 4 August 1946 (attached to 97th Bombardment Wing after 10 February 1951)
- 97th Bombardment Wing, 16 June 1952
- 4038th Strategic Wing, 15 February 1960 – 1 February 1963

=== Stations ===
- MacDill Field, Florida, 3 February 1942
- Sarasota Army Air Field, Florida, 29 March – 16 May 1942
- RAF Polebrook (Station 110), England, 12 June 1942
- Maison Blanche Airport, Algeria, c. 16 November 1942
- Tafaraoui Airfield, Algeria, c. 22 November 1942
- Biskra Airfield, Algeria, 27 December 1942
- Chateau-dun-du-Rhumel Airfield, Algeria, 8 February 1943
- Pont du Fahs Airfield, Tunisia, 11 August 1943
- Depienne Airfield, Tunisia, 14 August 1943
- Cerignola Airfield, Italy, 12 December 1943
- Amendola Airfield, Italy, 17 January 1944
- Marcianise Airfield, Italy, c. 1–29 October 1945
- Smoky Hill Army Air Field (later Smoky Hill Air Force Base), Kansas, 4 August 1946
- Biggs Air Force Base, Texas, 17 May 1948
- Blytheville Air Force Base, Arkansas, 1 July 1959
- Dow Air Force Base, Maine, 15 February 1960 – 1 February 1963

=== Aircraft ===
- Boeing B-17 Flying Fortress, 1942–1945
- Boeing B-29 Superfortress, 1946–1950
- Boeing B-50 Superfortress, 1950–1955
- Boeing B-47 Stratojet, 1955–1959
- Boeing B-52 Stratofortress, 1960–1963

=== Awards and campaigns ===
Award streamer	Award	Dates	Notes
	Distinguished Unit Citation	24 February 1944	Steyr, Austria
	Distinguished Unit Citation	18 August 1944	Ploesti, Romania
	Air Force Outstanding Unit Award	2 uly-3 November 1957	

Campaign Streamer	Campaign	Dates	Notes
	Antisubmarine	29 March 1942–16 May 1942	
	Air Combat, EAME Theater	11 June 1942–11 May 1945	
	Air Offensive, Europe	4 July 1942–5 June 1944	
	Egypt-Libya	13 November 1942–12 February 1943	
	Naples-Foggia	18 August 1943–21 January 1944	
	Anzio	22 January 1944–24 May 1944	
	Rome-Arno	22 January 1944–9 September 1944	
	Central Europe	22 March 1944–21 May 1945	
	Normandy	6 June 1944–24 July 1944	
	Northern France	25 July 1944–14 September 1944	
	Southern France	15 August 1944–14 September 1944	
	North Apennines	10 September 1944–4 April 1945	
	Rhineland	15 September 1944–21 March 1945	
	Po Valley	3 April 1945–8 May 1945	

== See also ==
- Boeing B-17 Flying Fortress Units of the Mediterranean Theater of Operations
- List of B-29 Superfortress operators
- List of B-50 units of the United States Air Force
- List of B-47 units of the United States Air Force
- List of B-52 Units of the United States Air Force
