= Armed Forces Expeditionary Medal =

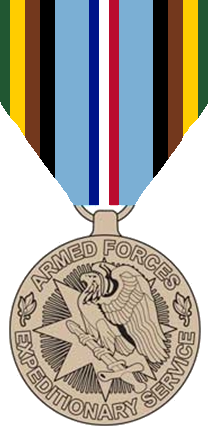
- Obverse
- Type: Military medal Campaign medal
- Presented by: The Department of Defense
- Eligibility: Served in the U.S. Armed Forces after July 1, 1958, and participated in U.S. military operations, U.S. operations in direct support of the United Nations, or U.S. operations of assistance for friendly foreign nations.
- Reverse
- Status: Currently awarded
- Established: Executive Order 10977, December 4, 1961
- Service ribbon and streamer

Precedence
- Next (higher): Antarctica Service Medal; Army / USAF; Coast Guard Arctic Service Medal; UCCG
- Next (lower): Vietnam Service Medal

The Armed Forces Expeditionary Medal (AFEM) is a military award of the United States Armed Forces, which was first created in 1961 by Executive Order of President John F. Kennedy. The medal is awarded to members of the U.S. Armed Forces who, after July 1, 1958, participated in U.S. military operations, U.S. operations in direct support of the United Nations, or U.S. operations of assistance for friendly foreign nations.

== Appearance ==
The Armed Forces Expeditionary Medal is issued as a bronze medal, 1 1/4 inches in diameter.

The obverse side of the medal consists of an eagle, with wings addorsed and inverted (representing the strength of the United States Armed Forces), standing on a sword loosened in its scabbard, and super- imposed on a radiant compass rose of eight points, (representing the readiness to serve wherever needed) all within the circumscription "ARMED FORCES" above and "EXPEDITIONARY SERVICE" below with a sprig of laurel on each side. On the reverse side of the medal is the shield from the United States Coat of Arms above two laurel branches separated by a bullet, all within the circumscription "UNITED STATES OF AMERICA".

The ribbon is 1 3/8 inches wide and consists of the following stripes: 3/32 inch Green, 3/32 inch Golden Yellow, 3/32 inch Spicebrown, 3/32 inch Black, 7/32 inch Bluebird, 1/16 inch Ultramarine Blue, 1/16 inch White, 1/16 inch Scarlet, 7/32 inch Bluebird, 3/32 inch Black, 3/32 inch Spicebrown, 3/32 inch Golden Yellow and 3/32 inch Green.

Ribbon devices

A bronze service star is authorized for participation in subsequent U.S. military operations authorized for award of the AFEM (only one award is authorized for each designated U.S. military operation). A silver service star is worn in lieu of five bronze service stars.

The Arrowhead device is authorized for United States Army, United States Air Force, and United States Space Force personnel who are awarded the medal through participation in an airborne or amphibious assault.

The Fleet Marine Force Combat Operation Insignia is authorized for U.S. Navy service members assigned to Marine Corps units that participate in combat during the assignment.

== Criteria ==
The Armed Forces Expeditionary Medal may be authorized for three categories of operations: U.S. military operations; U.S. military operations in direct support of the United Nations; and U.S. operations of assistance for friendly foreign nations. The medal shall be awarded only for operations for which no other U.S. campaign medal is approved, where a foreign armed opposition or imminent threat of hostile action was encountered.

Since its original conception in 1961, the Armed Forces Expeditionary Medal has been awarded for United States participation in over forty five designated military campaigns. The first campaign of the AFEM was the Cuban Missile Crisis and the award was issued for military service between October 1962 and June 1963. Following this original issuance, the AFEM was made retroactive to 1958 and issued for actions in Lebanon, Taiwan, Republic of the Congo, Quemoy and Matsu, and for duty in Berlin between 1961 and 1963.

During the early years of the Vietnam War, the Armed Forces Expeditionary Medal was issued for initial operations in South Vietnam, Laos, and Cambodia. The Armed Forces Expeditionary Medal was intended to replace the Marine Corps Expeditionary Medal and Navy Expeditionary Medal, but this never occurred and both services continue to award their service expeditionary medals and the AFEM, though not concurrently for the same action.

In 1965, with the creation of the Vietnam Service Medal, the AFEM was discontinued for Vietnam War service. As the Vietnam Service Medal was retroactively authorized, those personnel who had previously received the AFEM were granted the option to exchange the Armed Forces Expeditionary Medal for the Vietnam Service Medal. In 1968, the AFEM was awarded for Naval operations in defense of the USS Pueblo (AGER-2), which was seized by North Korea, as well as for Korean Service, and awarded for Thailand and Cambodia operations in 1973. Because of these awards during the Vietnam War period, some military personnel have been awarded both the Armed Forces Expeditionary Medal & the Vietnam Service Medal. Some military advisers involved in the 1973 Arab–Israeli War were also awarded the medal for their involvement in the supply and training of the IDF on the use and deployment of anti-tank weapons.

In the 1990s, it was awarded to numerous Naval ships such as USS Simpson (FFG-56) who enforced the Dayton Peace Accords and operated in the Adriatic Sea enforcing UN arms embargo against Croatia and Bosnia-Herzegovina and participating in Operation Sharp Guard and Operation Joint Endeavor up through and during the Bosnian crisis.

In 1993, Somalia, (The Battle of Mogadishu), also known as the Black Hawk Down Incident, was part of (Operation Gothic Serpent). Operation Gothic Serpent was a military operation conducted in Mogadishu, Somalia, by an American force code-named (Task Force Ranger) during the Somali Civil War in 1993. The (Armed Forces Expeditionary Medal) was awarded to numerous Naval ships in the Amphibious Squadron 5, the USS New Orleans (LPH-11), USS Denver (LPD-9), USS Comstock (LSD-45), and USS Cayuga (LST-1186).

In 2003, with the creation of the Global War on Terrorism Expeditionary Medal, the AFEM was discontinued for Iraq, Saudi Arabia, and Kuwait. After 18 March 2003, some personnel became eligible for the Armed Forces Expeditionary Medal, as well as the Global War on Terrorism Expeditionary Medal. Only one medal may be awarded, however, and individuals or units that deployed to the Gulf for Operation Southern Watch, and then immediately transitioned to Operation Iraqi Freedom, are not eligible for both medals.

Beginning in 1992 an effort was begun to phase out the AFEM in favor of campaign specific medals and the newly created Armed Forces Service Medal. The Armed Forces Service Medal was also originally intended to be a replacement for the Armed Forces Expeditionary Medal, however the two awards are currently considered separate awards with different award criteria. The primary difference between the two is that the Armed Forces Expeditionary Medal is normally awarded for combat operations and combat support missions.

== Approved operations ==
=== U.S. military operations ===
After the close of the Vietnam War, the Armed Forces Expeditionary Medal was issued for various military operations in Panama, Grenada, and Libya Operation El Dorado Canyon.

Approved U.S. Military Operations for the Armed Forces Expeditionary Medal
Area or operation	Start date	End date
Quemoy and Matsu Islands	23 August 1956	1 June 1963
Lebanon (1958 Lebanon crisis)	1 July 1958	1 November 1958
Taiwan Straits (Second Taiwan Strait Crisis)	23 August 1958	1 January 1959
Berlin (Berlin Crisis)	14 August 1961	1 June 1963
Cuba	24 October 1962	1 June 1963
Congo (Operation Dragon Rouge)	23 November 1964	27 November 1964
Dominican Republic (Operation Power Pack)	28 April 1965	21 September 1966
Korea (Note: Also eligible for the Korean Defense Service Medal for same timeframe as a DOD exception to policy, Code of Federal Regulations Title 32 National Defense Volume 3, dated 7 July 2008)	1 October 1966	30 June 1974
Arab–Israeli War (Operation Nickel Grass)	October 6, 1973	October 25, 1973
Cambodia (Evacuation-Operation Eagle Pull)	11 April 1975	13 April 1975
Vietnam (Evacuation Operation Frequent Wind) (Note: May exchange AFEM for Vietnam Service Medal, Code of Federal Regulations Title 32 National Defense Volume 3, dated 7 July 2008)	29 April 1975	30 April 1975
Mayagüez Operation	15 May 1975	15 May 1975
Grenada (Operation Urgent Fury)	23 October 1983	21 November 1983
Libya (Operation El Dorado Canyon)	12 April 1986	17 April 1986
Persian Gulf (Operation Earnest Will)	24 July 1987	26 September 1988
Panama (Operation Just Cause)	20 December 1989	31 January 1990
Somalia, Operation Restore Hope Unified Task Force	5 December 1992	4 May 1993
Somalia, Battle of Mogadishu, (Operation Gothic Serpent)	22 August 1993	13 October 1993
Somalia, Operation United Shield	9 January 1995	3 March 1995
Haiti (Operation Uphold Democracy)	16 September 1994	31 March 1995
Kuwait, UAE, Bahrain, waters of the Arabian / Persian Gulf (Operation Southern Watch)	December 1995	March 2003
Saudi Arabia (Operation Southern Watch)	December 1995	March 2003
Haiti (Operation Secure Tomorrow)	29 February 2004	15 June 2004
Former Republic of Yugoslavia (Note: The Kosovo Campaign Medal transitioned to the AFEM effective January 1, 2014; hence, start date for award of the AFEM does not coincide with the start date of Operation JOINT GUARDIAN)	1 January 2014	to a date to be determined

=== U.S. operations in direct support of the United Nations ===
The medal is also authorized for several United Nations actions, such as peacekeeping efforts in Somalia.

Approved U.S. Operations in Direct Support of the United Nations for the Armed Forces Expeditionary Medal
Area or operation	Start date	End date
Democratic Republic of the Congo	14 July 1960	1 September 1962
Somalia (Operation Restore Hope, Operation United Shield)	5 December 1992	31 March 1995

=== U.S. operations in direct support of NATO operations ===
The medal is also authorized for NATO peacekeeping operations in Bosnia and Herzegovina and Croatia.

Approved U.S. Operations in Direct Support of the North Atlantic Treaty Organization (NATO) for the Armed Forces Expeditionary Medal
Area or operation	Start date	End date
Former Republic of Yugoslavia (Operation Joint Endeavor) (Note: Also entitled to Armed Forces Service Medal for above same timeframe as an exception to policy, Code of Federal Regulations Title 32 National Defense Volume 3, dated 7 July 2008) (Note: Only for participants deployed in Bosnia and Herzegovina and Croatia, The Institute of Heraldry: Armed Forces Expeditionary Medal)	1 June 1992	19 December 1996
Former Republic of Yugoslavia (Operation Joint Guard)	20 December 1996	20 June 1998
Former Republic of Yugoslavia (Operation Joint Forge)	21 June 1998	2 December 2004
Former Republic of Yugoslavia (Operation Joint Guardian)	11 June 1999	TBD

=== U.S. operations of assistance for a friendly foreign nation ===
The AFEM has been issued for numerous operations in the Persian Gulf, most notably Operation Earnest Will, which began in 1987 and lasted until the eve of Operation Desert Shield. Following the close of Desert Storm, and the engagement in peacekeeping and sanction missions against Iraq, the Armed Forces Expeditionary Medal was issued again for several operations such as Operation Northern Watch, Operation Southern Watch, and Operation Vigilant Sentinel.

Approved U.S. Operations of Assistance for a Friendly Foreign Nation for the Armed Forces Expeditionary Medal
Area or operation	Start date	End date
Vietnam (General Service)	1 July 1958	3 July 1965
Laos	19 April 1961	7 October 1962
Cambodia (Vietnam Support Operations)	29 March 1973	15 August 1973
Thailand (Cambodia Support Operations)	29 March 1973	15 August 1973
El Salvador	1 January 1981	1 February 1992
Lebanon	1 June 1983	1 December 1987
Persian Gulf (Operation Earnest Will)	24 July 1987	1 August 1990
Southwest Asia (Operation Southern Watch)	1 December 1995	18 March 2003
Southwest Asia (Maritime Intercept Operations)	1 December 1995	18 March 2003
Southwest Asia (Operation Vigilant Sentinel)	1 December 1995	15 February 1997
Southwest Asia (Operation Northern Watch)	1 January 1997	18 March 2003
Southwest Asia (Operation Desert Thunder)	11 November 1998	22 December 1998
Southwest Asia (Operation Desert Fox)	16 December 1998	22 December 1998
Southwest Asia (Operation Desert Spring)	31 December 1998	18 March 2003

== Similar awards ==
Similar awards of the Armed Forces Expeditionary Medal:

The Global War on Terrorism Expeditionary Medal (the AFEM is no longer issued for operations in the Middle East, but may be reactivated for future campaigns which may not qualify for either the Global War on Terrorism Expeditionary Medal, Iraq Campaign Medal, and Afghanistan Campaign Medal). Similar in nature to the AFEM, the GWOTEM is awarded for deploying abroad on or after Sept. 11, 2001 (and a future date to be determined), for service in Operation Enduring Freedom (OEF) or Operation Iraqi Freedom (OIF). Service stars are also authorized for the Global War on Terrorism Expeditionary Medal effective February 9, 2015, retroactive to September, 11, 2001. Each service star represents a deployment in support of an approved GWOT operation. Only one GWOT-EM is awarded for each operation (five bronze service stars are authorized for six approved deployment operations). The GWOT-EM approved operations by inclusive dates are:

Enduring Freedom: September 11, 2001 – present
Iraqi Freedom: March 19, 2003 - August 31, 2010
Nomad Shadow: November 5, 2007 – present
New Dawn (Operation Iraqi Freedom renamed): September 1, 2010 – December 31, 2011
Inherent Resolve: June 15, 2014 – present
Freedom's Sentinel: January 1, 2015 – August 31, 2021

The Navy Expeditionary Medal and the Marine Corps Expeditionary Medal. In the modern era, service members who were authorized one of these medals are occasionally permitted to choose between receipt of the Armed Forces Expeditionary Medal or the service specific expeditionary medal. The AFEM and the Navy/Marine Expeditionary Medal cannot be bestowed simultaneously for the same action.

The Air and Space Expeditionary Service Ribbon. Although similar in name, this award is unrelated to the Armed Forces Expeditionary Medal and is presented for duty performed on U.S. Air Force and U.S. Space Force deployments.

== See also ==
- Awards and decorations of the United States military
- U.S. Army Institute of Heraldry
- National Personnel Records Center (Military Personnel Records Center)
