= Arrowhead device =

US military award accoutrement

Arrowhead Device
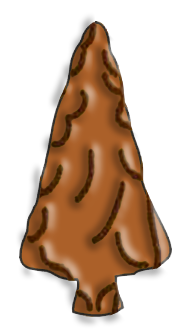
- Type: Ribbon Device
- Awarded for: Participation in a combat parachute jump, helicopter assault landing, combat glider landing, or amphibious assault landing
- Sponsored by: United States Air Force United States Army
- Status: Currently Awarded
- Established: June 1944
- Related: Fleet Marine Force Combat Operation Insignia

The arrowhead device is a miniature bronze arrowhead that may be worn on campaign, expedition, and service medals and ribbons to denote participation in an amphibious assault landing, combat parachute jump, helicopter assault landing, or combat glider landing by a service member of the United States Army, United States Air Force, or United States Space Force. The device was first awarded with the European-African-Middle East Campaign Medal in June 1944.

== Criteria ==
A soldier, airman, or guardian must be assigned or attached as a member of an organized force carrying out an assigned tactical mission. A soldier, airman, or guardian must actually exit an aircraft or watercraft to receive assault credit. Individual assault credit is tied directly to the combat assault credit decision for the unit to which the soldier, airman, or guardian is attached or assigned at the time of the assault. Should a unit be denied assault, no assault credit will accrue to the individual soldiers, airmen, or guardian of that unit.

The arrowhead device must be authorized for wear in order to be worn on the suspension and service ribbons of the medal and is placed in position to the wearer's right of other devices on the ribbons including the "V" device, 3/16 in (4.8 mm) service star, and 3/16-inch campaign star. No more than one arrowhead may be worn on a medal and service ribbon. As of 2004, the medals which are authorized the arrowhead device are as follows:

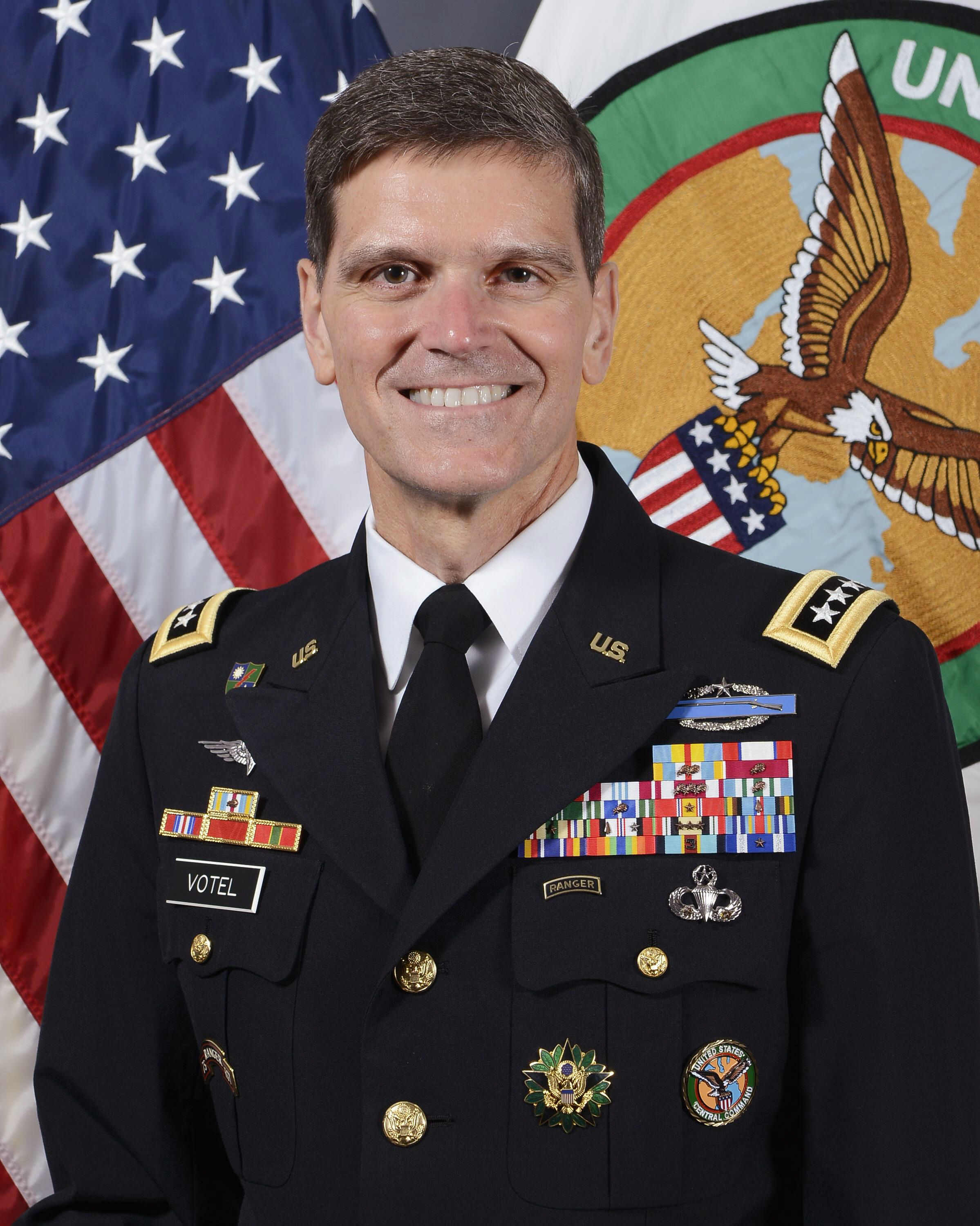
Examples of the arrowhead device as seen on the Afghanistan Campaign and Armed Forces Expeditionary Medals for airborne operations by GEN Joseph Votel (ret), which correspond to the two Combat Jump Devices on his Master Parachutist Badge

Afghanistan Campaign Medal
Armed Forces Expeditionary Medal
Global War on Terrorism Expeditionary Medal
Iraq Campaign Medal
Inherent Resolve Campaign Medal
Vietnam Service Medal
Korean Service Medal
European-African-Middle Eastern Campaign Medal
Asiatic-Pacific Campaign Medal

== Appearance ==
The arrowhead device is a bronze replica of a Native American arrowhead 1/4 in (6.4 mm) high. The device is embroidered on organizational streamers when specified in official U.S. Army lineage and honor documentation.

== See also ==
- Awards and decorations of the United States military
- United States military award devices
