= Chateaudun-du-Rhumel Airfield =

Abandoned military airfield in Algeria

Chateaudun-du-Rhumel Airfield
- Part of Twelfth Air Force
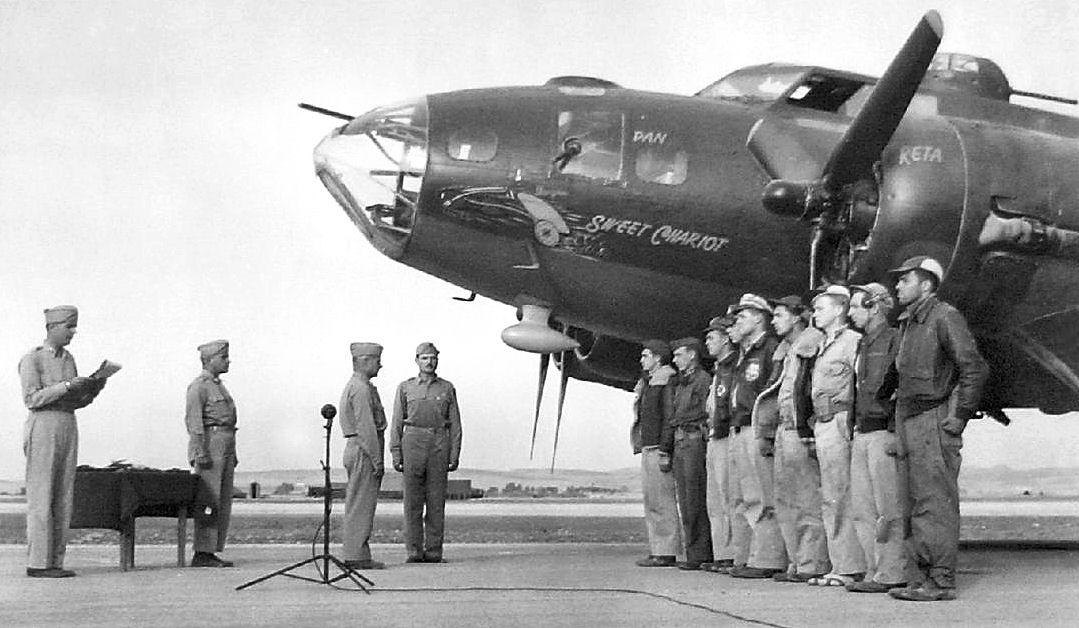
- Gen. Jimmy Doolittle awards the Purple Heart to the aircrew of Boeing B-17E Fortress 41-9021 ‘Sweet Chariot’ at Chateau-dun-du-Rhumel Airfield, Algeria, July 1943.

Site information
- Type: Military Airfield
- Controlled by: United States Army Air Forces

Location
- Coordinates: 36°08′39″N 006°07′53″E

Site history
- Built: 1942
- In use: 1942–1943

Location of Chateau-dun-du-Rhumel Airfield, Algeria

Chateaudun-du-Rhumel (Chateaudun Du Rhumel) Airfield is an abandoned military airfield in Algeria, located about 6 km north-northwest of Chelghoum el Aid, in Mila province, about 47 km southwest of Constantine.

== Overview ==
During World War II it was used by the United States Army Air Force Twelfth Air Force during the North African Campaign against the German Afrika Korps. The airfield was built by the United States Army Corps of Engineers, and its primary use was that of a heavy bomber airfield, with concrete runways, hardstands and taxiways. Billeting and support facilities consisted of tents. The 2d Bomb Group and the 97th Bomb Group were the primary tenants at the airfield, both flying B-17 Flying Fortresses missions over targets in Italy; Tunisia; Sicily and Sardinia. The 1st Fighter Group flew escort for the Fortresses, as well as attacking enemy ground targets of opportunity.

Known units assigned to the airfield were:

- HQ 5th Bombardment Wing, March– August 1943
- HQ 7th Fighter Wing (later 47th Bombardment Wing), 11 January – 1 March 1943
- 1st Fighter Group, ca. 16 Feb 43 - 29 Jun 43 Lockheed P-38 Lightning

27th, 71st, 94th Fighter Squadrons

- 2d Bombardment Group, 27 April – 7 June 1943, B-17 Flying Fortress

20th, 49th, 96th, 429th Bombardment Squadrons

- 97th Bombardment Group, 8 February – 1 August 1943, B-17 Flying Fortress

340th, 341st, 342d, 414th Bombardment Squadrons

- 37th Service Group, 12 Feb 43 - 12 Aug 43

26th, 49th Service Squadrons, 1033d Signal Company, 1070th Ordnance Company (Air Base), 1680th Ordnance Medium Maintenance Company

When the Americans moved out in late 1943, the airfield was dismantled and abandoned. Today, there is almost no evidence of its existence, as the land has returned to agricultural use. Faint outlines of dispersal pads, runways and taxiways can be seen in aerial photography, and there may be a number of agricultural buildings on a former concreted aircraft parking/maintenance area to the south of the field.

== See also ==
- Boeing B-17 Flying Fortress airfields in the Mediterranean Theater of Operations
