= All American (aircraft) =

American heavy bomber of World War II

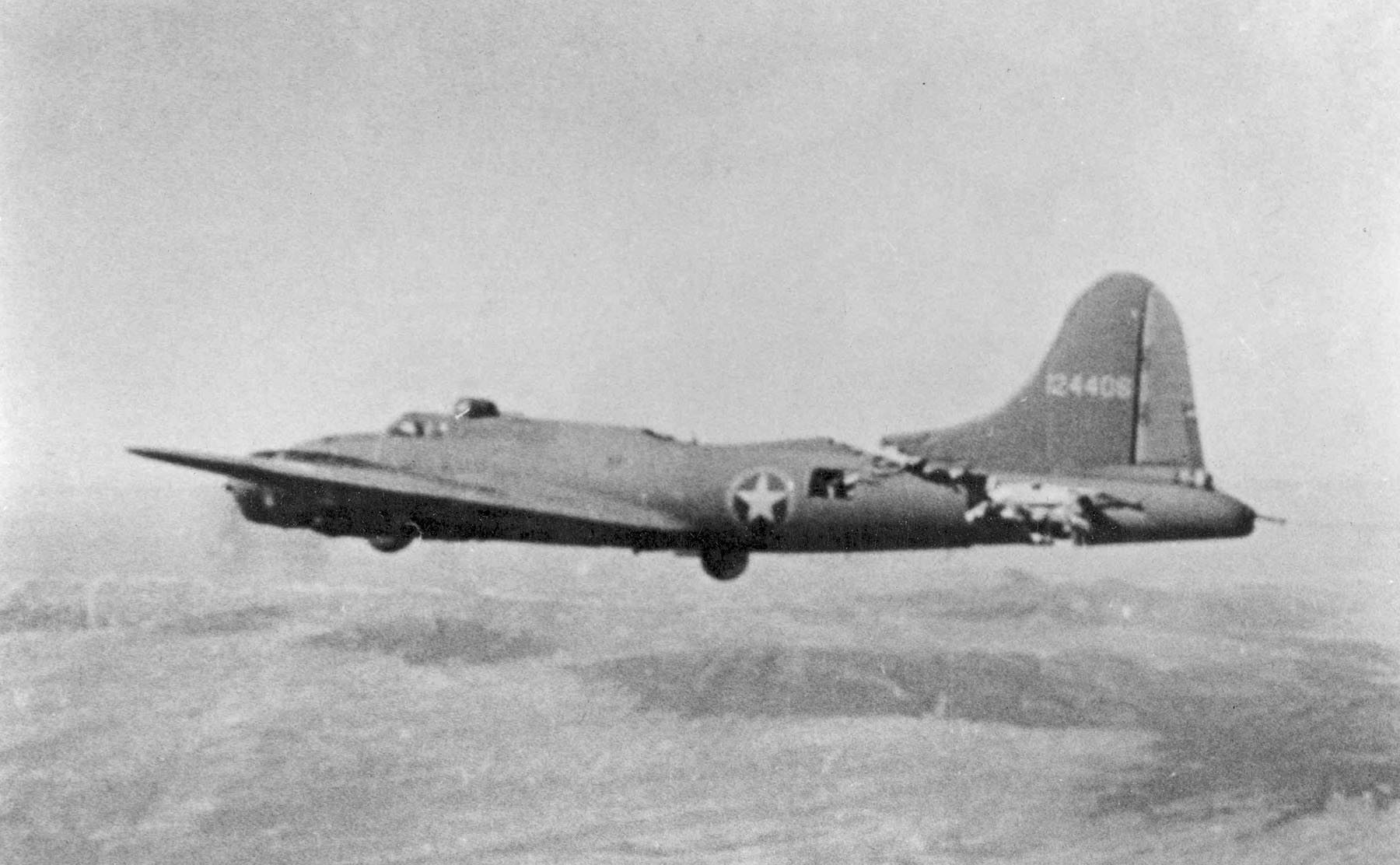
- The All American returning to base after its collision with an enemy fighter

General information
- Type: Boeing B-17F-5-BO Flying Fortress
- Manufacturer: Boeing
- Owners: USAAF
- Serial: 41-24406

History
- In service: 1942–1945
- Fate: Dismantled for salvage at Lucera Airfield, Italy, on 6 March 1945

The All American (full name All American III) was a World War II Boeing B-17F Flying Fortress heavy bomber that was able to return safely to its base after having its rear fuselage nearly cut off by a mid-air collision with a German Bf 109 over enemy-held territory. The bomber's flight is said to have yielded one of the most famous photographs of World War II, and has been linked with the phrase "Comin' in on a Wing and a Prayer." It inspired the 414th Bombardment Squadron's emblem, an image of a puppy praying atop an aircraft's tail section.

== The aircraft ==
The All American was a B-17F-5-BO, serial number 41-24406, in the 97th Bombardment Group, 414th Bombardment Squadron.

== The mission ==
On February 1, 1943, bombers of the 414th Bombardment Squadron departed their base near Biskra, Algeria, to attack the German-controlled seaports, Bizerte and Tunis, Tunisia. After dropping their bombloads and returning toward base, the bombers were attacked by German fighters, believed to be Messerschmitt Bf 109s. Two fighters attacked the lead B-17 and the All American which was flying next to it in formation. The bombers' machine gun fire downed the first fighter, but the second pressed its head-on attack against the All American. Apparently struck by machine gun fire, the second fighter could not complete its roll to pull down and away from the All American, the pilot apparently having been killed or disabled. The German pilot was reported as being 16-victory ace Erich Paczia of I/Jagdgeschwader 53.

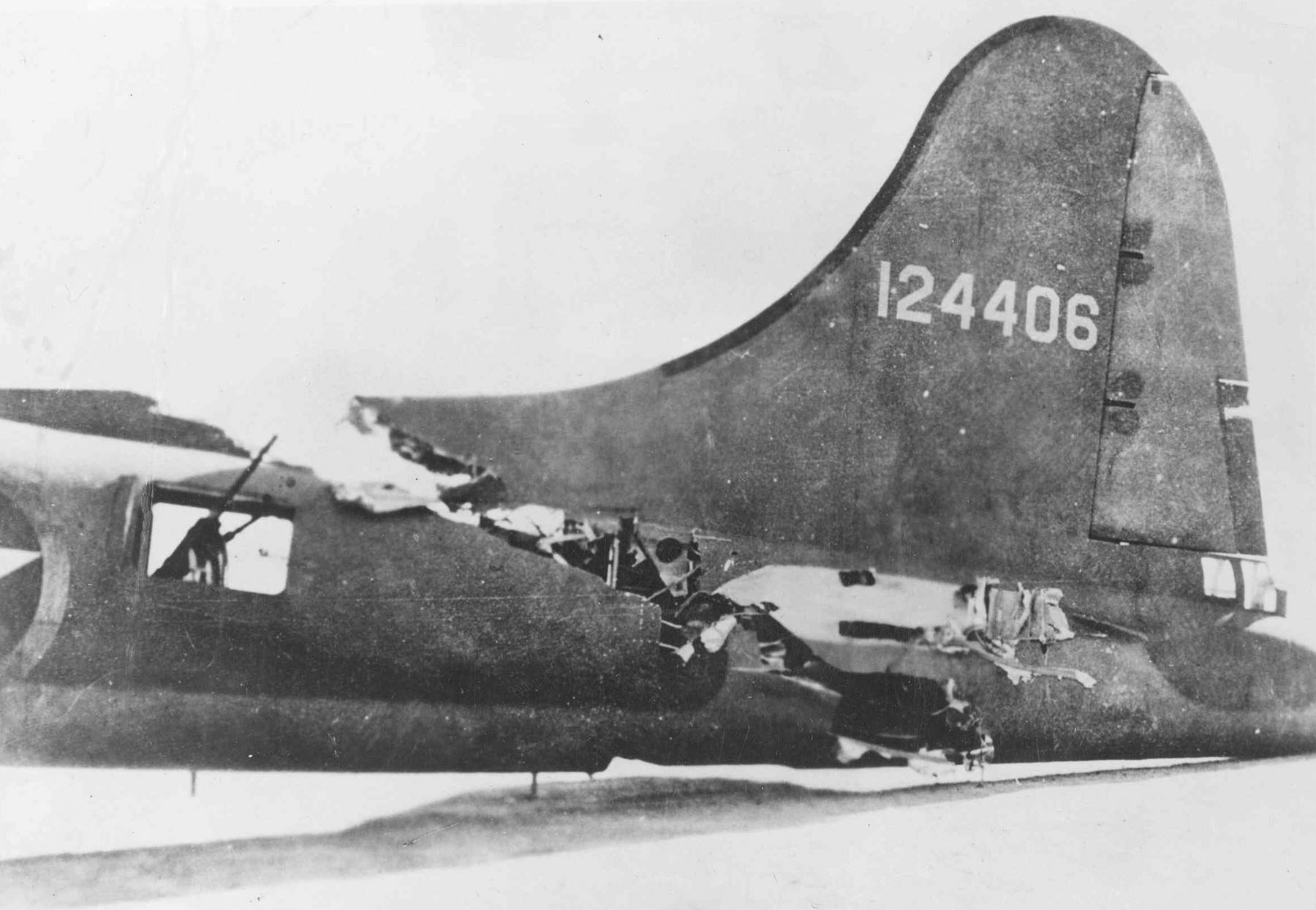
The aircraft returned safely to base despite the extensive damage to its rear fuselage.

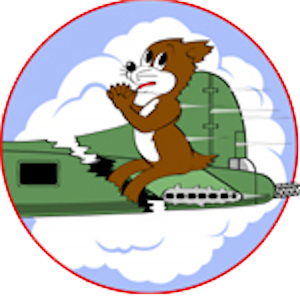
Emblem of the 414th Bombardment Squadron in World War II

The fighter's wing collided with the top rear fuselage of the All American, almost cleaving the bomber's tail section off, leaving a large diagonal gash from the base of the All American's vertical stabilizer and severing the left horizontal stabilizer from the plane. Metal in the airframe near the right tailplane was the only thing keeping the tail section, housing the rear gunner, attached to the aircraft. The fighter broke apart, leaving some pieces in the bomber's fuselage. Even though the control cables were severed, the crew was able to continue to fly the aircraft by using the autopilot system for the Norden bombsight, as it employed electric wires connecting to electric motor servos mounted next to the rudder and elevator.

The bomber squadron maintained formation to protect the All American until they were beyond the range of enemy fighters, with the crew donning parachutes in the expectation of having to bail out. However, the aircraft was piloted to a safe landing at its base, and despite the damage, none of the crew was injured.

The All American was repaired and returned to service as a hack with the 352d Bombardment Squadron, 301st Bombardment Group, and flew until its March 1945 dismantlement.

The All American is reputed to be the source of the phrase, "Comin' in on a Wing and a Prayer," and inspired the 414th Bombardment Squadron's emblem. An image of a puppy praying atop the rear fuselage formed the unit badge. The aircraft was the subject of what has been called one of the most famous photographs of World War II.

== Mythology ==
Several false myths accrued in the lore of the All American, some of which were refuted in a 2012 interview of her bombardier Ralph Burbridge. Burbridge explained that the aircraft returned to her base in North Africa, and could not have made a long trip back to England as widely recounted. The base near Biskra, Algeria, was a more reasonable 300 miles (480 km) from the bombing target.

Burbridge also said that the collision occurred when the bomber group was returning to base after having dropped its bombs on target, so that the aircraft did not complete a bombing run after being damaged as had been incorrectly recounted. Burbridge's account confirms that the 10 crew members donned their parachutes, contradicting stories that the crew sacrificed some of their parachutes to hold the plane together or for an in-flight rescue of crew members from the isolated tail section.

The Harold Adamson and Jimmy McHugh 1943 song "Comin' In on a Wing and a Prayer" was not written about All American as sometimes reported, but was about another 97th Bomb Group B-17, Thunderbird.

== Crew members ==
In a wartime letter, navigator Harry C. Nuessle listed the All American's crew of its 1 February 1943 flight, along with their signatures:

- Pilot – Ken Bragg Jr.†
- Copilot – G. Engel Jr. or G. Boyd Jr.‡
- Navigator – Harry C. Nuessle
- Bombardier – Ralph Burbridge
- Engineer – Joe C. James
- Radio Operator – Paul A. Galloway
- Ball Turret Gunner – Elton Conda
- Waist Gunner – Michael Zuk
- Tail Gunner – Sam T. Sarpolus
- Ground Crew Chief – Hank Hyland

† Bragg was a halfback on the 1938 Duke Blue Devils football team.

‡ The signature of the copilot has an unclear surname. It has been read as "G. Boyd Jr." (Melville Guy Boyd Jr., 1921–1966) or as "G. Engel Jr." (Godfrey Engel Jr., 1915–2007). Research indicates Boyd was assigned to the 100th Bomb Group, not the 97th Bomb Group, while Engel's obituary noted that he served in the 97th. Signatures of both Boyd and Engel can be seen on their draft registration cards.
