= Inherent Resolve Campaign Medal =

Award of the United States military

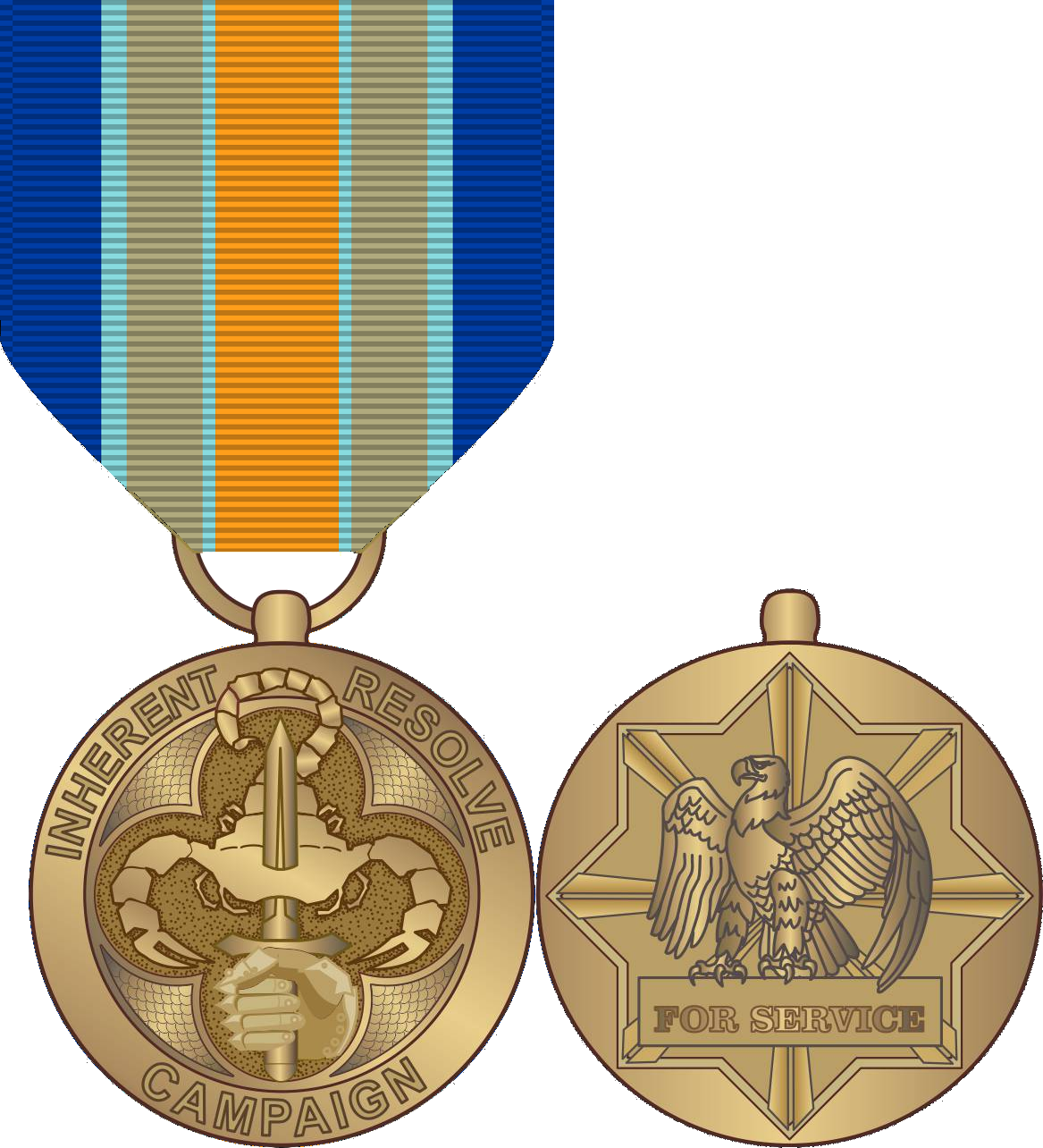
- Obverse and reverse
- Type: Military medal Campaign medal
- Awarded for: Service in Syria from 15 June 2014 to TBD
- Presented by: The U.S. Department of Defense
- Eligibility: United States military personnel
- Status: Active
- Established: 30 March 2016
- First award: April 2016 (retroactive to 15 June 2014)
- Service ribbon and campaign streamer

Precedence
- Next (higher): Iraq Campaign Medal
- Next (lower): Global War on Terrorism Expeditionary Medal

The Inherent Resolve Campaign Medal is a United States Department of Defense service award and campaign medal. The medal was established by Executive Order on 30 March 2016 by U.S. President Barack Obama. The medal may be awarded to members of the U.S. Army, Navy, Marine Corps, Air Force, and Coast Guard, for service in Iraq, Syria, or contiguous waters or airspace retroactively from 15 June 2014 to a date yet to be determined. Service members who were awarded the Global War on Terrorism Expeditionary Medal for service that is now covered by the Inherent Resolve Campaign Medal may make application to be awarded the Inherent Resolve Campaign Medal in lieu of the Global War on Terrorism Expeditionary Medal. No service member will be entitled to the Global War on Terrorism Expeditionary Medal and Inherent Resolve Campaign Medal for the same action, time period, or service.

== Symbolism ==
According to the United States Army Institute of Heraldry's website, the medal's mailed fist and dagger represent "strength and courage in the defense of liberty and freedom". The scorpion being impaled was chosen because, "The scorpion, symbolic for treachery and destruction, is found on most major land masses."

The center of the ribbon is orange in color, surrounded by tan and blue, deriving its hues from the Ishtar Gate and the color of Southwestern Eurasian topography, which is primarily sand.

== Criteria ==
To qualify for the Inherent Resolve Campaign Medal, personnel must have been attached to a unit based in Iraq or Syria, fly missions over those countries, and/or serve in contiguous waters for 30 days consecutive, or non-consecutive. Service members who were killed or were medically evacuated from those countries due to wounds or injuries immediately qualify for the award, as do members who engaged in combat. Navy, Marine Corps, and Air Force personnel qualify for the Inherent Resolve Campaign Medal only after 30 qualifying days consecutive or non-consecutive. With the release of NAVADMIN 219/22, Effective 1 July 2022, eligibility for the IRCM is limited to the country of Syria and its associated airspace and contiguous waters out to 12 nautical miles. However, in an exception to policy memo signed by the Under Secretary of Defense on 24 August 2023, the IRCM was reinstated for qualifying service in Iraq from 1 January 2023 to 31 December 2024.

Eligible personnel will be awarded one medal with campaign star upon meeting the initial criteria for the award. Service in subsequent campaign phases qualifies personnel for additional campaign stars.

== Campaign phases and devices ==
The following are the approved campaign phases and respective inclusive dates for the Inherent Resolve Campaign Medal:

Phase	From	To
Abeyance	15 June 2014	24 November 2015
Intensification	25 November 2015	14 April 2017
Defeat	15 April 2017	1 July 2020
Normalize	2 July 2020	TBD

Examples of campaign stars worn on the Inherent Resolve Campaign service ribbon:

Any one of the four phases
Two of the four phases
Three of the four phases
All four phases

The following ribbon devices are authorized for wear on the Inherent Resolve Campaign Medal:

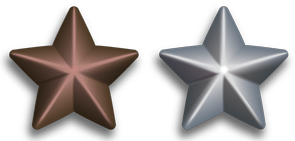
- Campaign stars (all branches)
- Arrowhead device (Army, Air Force, and Space Force)
- Fleet Marine Force Combat Operation Insignia (Navy personnel assigned to a Marine Corps unit in combat)
