= Service star =

Military decoration

Service Star
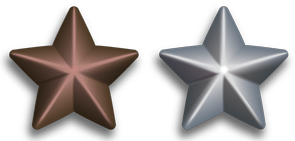
- Bronze and silver 3/16 inch stars
- Type: Ribbon device
- Awarded for: Worn to denote subsequent awards or periods of service.
- Presented by: the United States
- Status: Currently in use

A service star is a miniature bronze or silver five-pointed star 3/16 inch (4.8 mm) in diameter that is authorized to be worn by members of the eight uniformed services of the United States on medals and ribbons to denote an additional award or service period. The service star may also be referred to as a campaign star or battle star depending on which award the star is authorized for and the manner in which the device is used for the award. "Battle star" is also the term used to refer to decorations issued by the United States Navy during World War II and the Korean War to individual ships, recognizing a vessel's participation in a particular battle or operation.

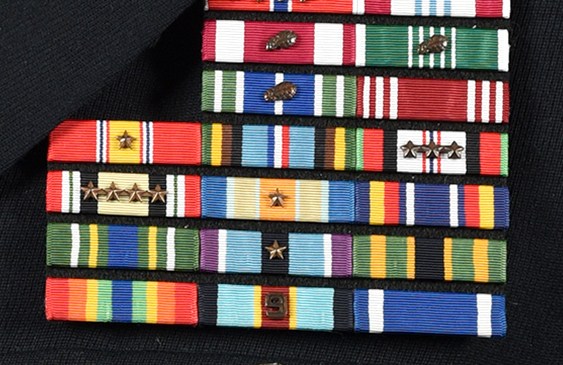
Stars on service ribbons

Service stars, campaign stars, and battle stars are worn with one point of the star pointing up on the suspension ribbon of a medal or service ribbon. A silver star is worn instead of five bronze stars. A service star is sometimes mistaken for a Bronze Star (Bronze Star Medal) or Silver Star (Silver Star Medal). The service star is also similar to the gold and silver 5/16 -inch stars that may be authorized to be worn on specific individual decorations of certain services to denote additional decorations.

== Service stars ==
=== Expeditionary medals ===
Service stars are authorized for these United States expeditionary medals:

- Armed Forces Expeditionary Medal
- Navy Expeditionary Medal
- Marine Corps Expeditionary Medal
- Global War on Terrorism Expeditionary Medal (GWOT-EM) effective February 9, 2015, retroactive to September 11, 2001. Each star represents a deployment in support of an approved GWOT operation. Four bronze service stars are authorized for five approved deployment operations (only one GWOT-EM is awarded for each operation). The five GWOT-EM-approved operations by inclusive dates are:
  - Enduring Freedom: Sep. 11, 2001 – to be determined (TBD)
  - Iraqi Freedom: Mar. 19, 2003 – Aug. 31, 2010
  - Nomad Shadow: Nov. 05, 2007 – TBD
  - New Dawn: Sep. 01, 2010 – Dec. 31, 2011
  - Inherent Resolve: Jun. 15, 2014 – TBD

=== Service medals ===
Service stars are authorized to denoted additional awards for these United States service medals:

- Prisoner of War Medal
- National Defense Service Medal
- Humanitarian Service Medal
- Air and Space Campaign Medal
- Armed Forces Service Medal
- Army Sea Duty Ribbon
- Military Outstanding Volunteer Service Medal

For the National Defense Service Medal, the addition of bronze service stars to denote participation in four of the designated wartime conflicts would be shown as (the time span from the end of the Korean War era in 1954 to the beginning of the Global War on Terrorism era in 2001 is 47 years, so it is highly improbable that any individual qualified for all four National Defense Service Medals in each of the four eras):

- Korean War
- Vietnam War
- Gulf War
- War on terrorism

First award: any one of four conflicts
Second award: two of the four conflicts
Third award: three of the four conflicts
Fourth award: all four conflicts

=== Unit awards ===
Service stars are authorized for certain unit awards (The service ribbon itself indicates the first award, with a bronze service star being added to indicate the second and subsequent awards. If ever applicable, a silver service star is worn instead of five bronze stars.) such as the:

- Presidential Unit Citation (Navy and Marine Corps)
- Navy Unit Commendation (Navy and Marine Corps)

== Campaign stars ==
Campaign stars are authorized for these United States campaign medals (bronze and silver campaign stars are worn to denote participation in a designated campaign or campaign phase or period):

- World War I Victory Medal
- American Defense Service Medal
- American Campaign Medal
- Asiatic–Pacific Campaign Medal
- European–African–Middle Eastern Campaign Medal
- Korean Service Medal
- Vietnam Service Medal
- Southwest Asia Service Medal
- Kosovo Campaign Medal
- Afghanistan Campaign Medal
- Iraq Campaign Medal
- Inherent Resolve Campaign Medal

For each designated campaign participated in, one star is worn on the ribbon. For example, when a member is authorized to wear the Iraq Campaign Medal, the potential addition of bronze and silver service stars for the seven designated Iraq Campaign phases would be:

Any one of the seven phases
Two of the seven phases
Three of the seven phases
Four of the seven phases
Five of the seven phases
Six of the seven phases
All seven campaign phases

For many of these awards, service stars are earned by participation in campaign phases and all eligible periods for the award fall within those defined phases. In these cases, the campaign medal cannot be earned alone, and is always to be worn with at least one campaign star.

== Battle stars ==
Since February 26, 2004, the Global War on Terrorism Expeditionary Medal and the Global War on Terrorism Service Medal (GWOT-SM) are authorized to be awarded with bronze and silver battle stars for personnel who were engaged in specific battles in combat under circumstances involving grave danger of death or serious bodily injury from enemy action. However, though authorized for wear, no battle stars have been approved for wear. Only a combatant commander can initiate a request for a battle star, and the Chairman of the Joint Chiefs of Staff is the approving authority, which since January 2016 has been eliminated by the Department of Defense for the GWOT-SM.

Only one award of the Global War on Terrorism Expeditionary Medal and one award of the Global War on Terrorism Service Medal may be authorized for any individual. No service stars were authorized for the Global War on Terrorism Expeditionary or Service Medal until February 9, 2015, when the Department of Defense authorized service stars for the Global War on Terrorism Expeditionary Medal retroactive to September 11, 2001.

== Earlier service stars and battle stars ==
Service stars (were sometimes referred to as campaign stars or battle stars) were also authorized for the World War I Victory Medal, American Defense Service Medal, American Campaign Medal, European–African–Middle Eastern Campaign Medal, and Asiatic–Pacific Campaign Medal. The specific manner of wear and symbolism of the stars varied from medal to medal. For example, an American Campaign Medal with a bronze service star indicated the service member had participated in an antisubmarine campaign. On other medals, bronze service stars were used on the medal's service ribbon for those recipients of medals in possession of authorized campaign clasps for those medals.

=== Navy warships ===
Historically, during World War II and the Korean War, commendations called "battle stars" were issued to United States Navy warships for meritorious participation in battle, or for having suffered damage during battle conditions. As an example, the USS Enterprise (CV-6) received 20 battle stars for her combat service in World War II, placing her first in the list of most decorated US Naval vessels of World War II.

Similarly, during the Vietnam War and afterwards, the Battle Effectiveness Award ("Battle E") took the place of receiving "battle stars" for superior battle efficiency in place of combat operations.

== See also ==
- 5/16 inch star
- Awards and decorations of the United States military
- United States military award devices
- Oak leaf cluster
