= Global War on Terrorism Expeditionary Medal =

American campaign medal

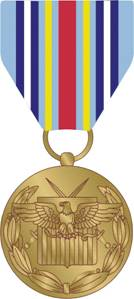
- Obverse
- Type: Military medal Campaign medal
- Awarded for: Serving or have served in military expeditions to combat terrorism.
- Presented by: the U.S. Department of Defense; U.S. Department of Homeland Security
- Eligibility: U.S. military personnel
- Reverse
- Status: Active
- Established: EO 13289, 12 March 2003
- First award: 2004 (retroactive to 11 September 2001)
- Service ribbon and campaign streamer

Precedence
- Next (higher): Inherent Resolve Campaign Medal
- Next (lower): Global War on Terrorism Service Medal
- Related: Global War on Terrorism Service Medal, Iraq Campaign Medal, Afghanistan Campaign Medal

The Global War on Terrorism Expeditionary Medal (GWOT-EM) is a United States Armed Forces award created by George W. Bush on 12 March 2003, through Executive Order 13289. The medal recognizes those military service members who have deployed overseas in direct service to the war on terror from 11 September 2001 to a date to be determined. Prior to 30 April 2005, the medal was awarded for service within Iraq and Afghanistan, but has been replaced with the Iraq Campaign Medal and Afghanistan Campaign Medal and serves primarily as recognition for personnel who have deployed in support of the war on terror to locations beyond Iraq and Afghanistan. In a similar fashion the Inherent Resolve Campaign Medal is issued for service in the fight against ISIS, with eligibility retroactive to 15 June 2014.

The War on Terrorism Expeditionary Medal was designed by John Sproston of the Army's Institute of Heraldry.

== Operations and devices ==
The following are the approved operations and respective dates for the Global War on Terrorism Expeditionary Medal (retroactive to 11 September 2001)

Note: Enduring Freedom name is still in operational use today for deployments to the Middle East, OEF encompasses Operation JUNIPER SHIELD, OCTAVE SHIELD and SPARTAN SHIELD.

Operation	From	To
Enduring Freedom (OEF)	11 September 2001	TBD
Iraqi Freedom (OIF)	19 March 2003	31 August 2010
Nomad Shadow (ONS)	5 November 2007	TBD
New Dawn (OND)	1 September 2010	31 December 2011
Observant Compass (OOC)	1 October 2011	30 September 2017
Counterterrorism EXORD - AFRICOM (USAFRICOM CT EXORD)	6 September 2012	TBD
Inherent Resolve (OIR)	15 June 2014	TBD
Freedom's Sentinel (OFS)	1 January 2015	31 August 2021
Odyssey Lightning (OOL)	1 August 2016	17 January 2017
Operation Pacific Eagle (OPE-P)	5 October 2017	TBD
Operation Enduring Sentinel (OES)	1 September 2021	TBD
Operation Prosperity Guardian (OPG)	18 December 2023	TBD
Operation Poseidon Archer (OPA)	18 January 2024	TBD
Operation Pandora Throttle (OPT)	13 May 2024	TBD

Examples of campaign stars worn on the Global War on Terrorism Expeditionary Medal service ribbon:

Any one of the nine operations
Two of the nine operations
Three of the nine operations
Four of the nine operations
Five of the nine operations
Six of the nine operations
Seven of the nine operations
Eight of the nine operations
All nine operations

The following ribbon devices are authorized for wear on the Global War on Terrorism Expeditionary Medal:

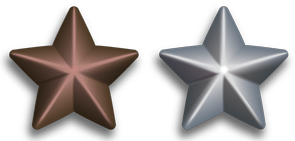
- Campaign stars (all branches)
- Arrowhead device (Army, Air Force, and Space Force)
- Fleet Marine Force Combat Operation Insignia (Navy personnel assigned to a Marine Corps unit in combat)

== Criteria ==
To be awarded the Global War on Terrorism Expeditionary Medal a military service member must perform duty in a deployed status and must participate in designated anti-terrorism operation for a period of either 30 consecutive or 60 non-consecutive days of duty. For those who were engaged in combat, killed, or wounded in the line of duty, the time requirement is waived. The term "deployed status" indicates either temporary or permanent orders to a duty station outside the borders of the United States of America with such duty being in direct support of anti-terrorism operations. For a service member to receive the Global War on Terrorism Expeditionary Medal, the deployment must also have taken place in a nation which is currently recognized as a base for anti-terrorism operations by the United States Department of Defense.

On 30 April 2005, the Global War on Terrorism Expeditionary Medal was discontinued for service within Iraq and Afghanistan, with such service recognized with the Iraq Campaign Medal or Afghanistan Campaign Medal. Personnel who received the GWOT-EM for previous service in these two regions may elect to exchange the GWOT-EM or retain the original award.

On 9 February 2015, the Defense Department authorized service stars to be worn on the GWOT-EM to represent different operations the recipient participated in.

The GWOT-EM is a Defense Department expeditionary medal. Award of this medal does not prevent award of other types of recognition (such as decorations) normally associated with deployment. This medal may be awarded posthumously.

The Global War on Terrorism Expeditionary Medal may be awarded for approved operations performed in any of the following geographical areas:

- Afghanistan
- Algeria
- Azerbaijan
- Bahrain
- Benin
- Bosnia and Herzegovina
- Bulgaria (Bourgas)
- Burkina Faso
- Burundi
- Cameroon
- Central African Republic
- Chad
- Colombia
- Crete
- Cyprus
- Democratic Republic of the Congo
- Diego Garcia
- Djibouti
- Egypt
- Eritrea
- Ethiopia
- France
- Georgia
- Greece
- Guantanamo Bay Naval Base (within the Joint Task Force Guantanamo compound)
- Hungary
- Iran
- Iraq Discontinued for service in Iraq as of 1 January 2012. Resumed for Operation Inherent Resolve.
- Israel
- Italy
- Jordan
- Kazakhstan
- Kenya
- Kosovo (only specified GWOT operations)
- Kuwait
- Kyrgyzstan
- Lebanon
- Mali
- Mauritania
- Morocco
- Niger
- Nigeria
- Oman
- Pakistan
- Philippines
- Qatar
- Romania (Constanţa)
- Rwanda
- Saudi Arabia
- Senegal
- Seychelles
- Sierra Leone
- Somalia
- South Sudan
- Spain
- Sudan
- Syria
- Tajikistan
- Tanzania
- Tunisia
- Turkey (East of 35 degrees E Longitude)
- Turkmenistan
- United Arab Emirates
- Uzbekistan
- Yemen

The following bodies of water are also approved qualifying areas:

- That portion of the Arabian Sea north of 10 degrees north latitude, and west of 68 degrees east longitude
- Bab-el-Mandeb
- Gulf of Aden
- Gulf of Aqaba
- Gulf of Oman
- Gulf of Suez
- A portion of the Mediterranean Sea ("boarding and searching operations") (East of 28 degrees E longitude)
- Persian Gulf
- Red Sea
- Strait of Hormuz
- Suez Canal

== Devices ==
The Global War on Terrorism Expeditionary Medal may be awarded with the devices:

- Arrowhead device - For qualified Army and Air Force service members.
- Service stars - effective 9 February 2015, to recognize individual participation in each of the approved operations that a service member participates in, a 3/16 inch bronze service star is worn on the suspension and service ribbon of the medal, with a 3/16 inch silver star being worn in lieu of five bronze stars.
- Fleet Marine Force Combat Operation Insignia - for qualified Navy service members such as hospital corpsmen assigned to Marine Corps units that participate in combat during the assignment.

== Expeditionary Medal and Service Medal ==
A similar medal, the Global War on Terrorism Service Medal (GWOT-SM), was created under the same Presidential Order that authorized the GWOT Expeditionary Medal. The primary difference between the two awards is that the service medal is intended for those who performed support duty within the United States, while the expeditionary medal recognizes those who were deployed to foreign countries. For those participating in multiple operations, both the GWOT Service and GWOT Expeditionary Medal may be authorized, but both medals can no longer be bestowed for the same qualifying period of service. The only exception is for service personnel who served in Iraq or Afghanistan prior to 30 April 2005. These personnel were awarded both the Global War on Terrorism Service Medal and the Global War on Terrorism Expeditionary Medal.

== Notable recipients ==
- Phyllis J. Wilson, 5th Command Chief Warrant Officer of the United States Army Reserve

== See also ==
- Arrowhead device
- Awards and decorations of the United States military
- Secretary of Defense Medal for the Global War on Terrorism
- Global War on Terrorism Service Medal
