= Pont du Fahs Airfield =

Abandoned World War II military airfield in Tunisia

Pont du Fahs Airfield
- Part of Twelfth Air Force

Site information
- Type: Military airfield
- Controlled by: United States Army Air Forces

Location
- Coordinates: 36°21′00.10″N 009°50′42.21″E

Site history
- Built: 1943
- In use: 1943

Location of Pont du Fahs Airfield, Tunisia

Pont du Fahs Airfield is an abandoned military airfield in Tunisia, which was located approximately 6 km west-southwest of El Fahs, and 55 km southwest of Tunis.

A Luftwaffe-held airfield prior to the Operation Torch landings, it was home to the 5.(Pz.)/Schlachtgeschwader 1, flying Henschel Hs 129 ground attack aircraft. It was captured by British parachute infantry forces on 29 November 1942. Once in Allied hands, it was used by B-17 Flying Fortress heavy bombers of the United States Army Air Force XII Bomber Command 97th Bombardment Group.

The 97th moved out in mid-August 1943 and after that the airfield was largely abandoned. Today some evidence of the airfield remains with the main runway being visible in aerial photography and traces of taxiways and disbursement hardstands.

== See also ==
- Boeing B-17 Flying Fortress airfields in the Mediterranean Theater of Operations
- El Fahs
- Pont du Fahs Airfield is the seventh mission in Sniper Elite III
