= Depienne Airfield =

Military airfield in Tunisia

Depienne Airfield
- Part of Twelfth Air Force
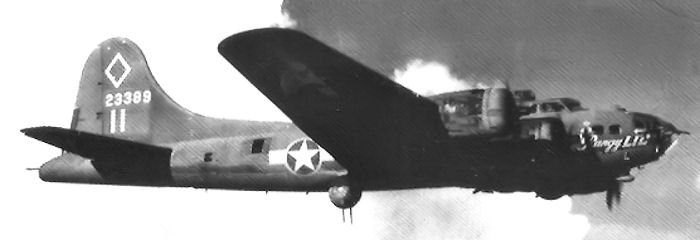
- B-17F 42-3399 "Rangy Lil" was assigned to the 347th Bomb Squadron in August 1943. and it is seen wearing the group's distinctive diamond Marking On the tail, along with the Roman II associated with the squadron.

Site information
- Type: Military airfield
- Controlled by: United States Army Air Forces
- Condition: inactive (still exists and use unknown)

Location
- Coordinates: 36°25′49.25″N 010°00′31.30″E

Site history
- Built: 1941

Location of Depienne Airfield, Tunisia

Depienne Airfield is a World War II airfield in Tunisia, located approximately 12 km northeast of El Fahs, and 53 km southwest of Tunis. The airfield was first used by the German Luftwaffe in 1941 and 1942, and was captured by the British Army in a parachute attack on 3 December 1942. It was later used by the United States Army Air Force Twelfth Air Force as a B-17 Flying Fortress heavy bomber airfield during the North African Campaign.

- HQ 5th Bombardment Wing, August–December 1943
- 97th Bombardment Group, 15 August-20 December 1943, B-17 Flying Fortress

In aerial imagery, the airfield looks almost like it did in 1943 and is probably the most well-preserved wartime bomber field in Tunisia. The runway, although deteriorated, as well as all of the taxiways and aircraft hardstands are very much in evidence. It is unclear what the current use of the facility is.

== See also ==
- Boeing B-17 Flying Fortress airfields in the Mediterranean Theater of Operations
