= Nomad Shadow =

Classified US military operation involving Turkey

Operation Nomad Shadow is the name of a classified United States military operation that may have begun in November 2007 to share intelligence information between the U.S. and the Republic of Turkey. The operation may involve only a few dozen U.S. servicemembers at any one time plus an unknown number of Turkish officials. A U.S. military-affiliated newspaper claimed the operation "reportedly provided Turkey with intelligence on Kurdish separatists ahead of Turkey’s incursion into northern Iraq in December 2007."

U.S. servicemembers who deployed in support of Operation Nomad Shadow may have also had been concurrently attached to support Operation Iraqi Freedom.

In 2013 the armed Kurdish guerrilla movement PKK claimed to have shot down a U.S. drone patrolling the Iraq-Turkey border as part of the program.

== Location ==
- Turkey
- Northern Iraq (north of the 36th parallel north)

== See also ==
- Global War on Terrorism Expeditionary Medal
- Global War on Terrorism Service Medal
