= XII Bomber Command =

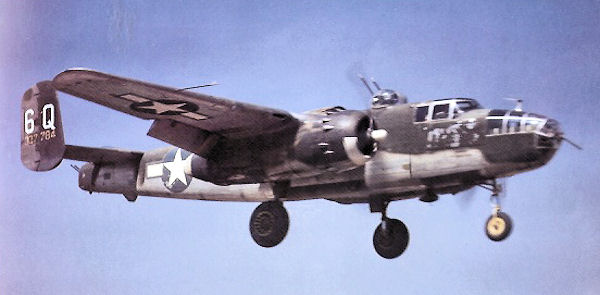
- Command B-25 Mitchell approaching Alesani Airfield Corsica (Note: Aircraft is North American B-25J-1-NC, serial 43-27784 of the 487th Bombardment Squadron in early 1944.)
- Active: 1942-1944
- Country: United States
- Branch: United States Air Force
- Role: Command of medium and light bomber units
- Part of: Twelfth Air Force; Northwest African Strategic Air Force
- Engagements: Mediterranean Theater of Operations

XII Bomber Command is an inactive United States Army Air Forces formation. Its last assignment was with the Twelfth Air Force, based in Corsica, France. It was constituted on 26 February 1942, activated on 13 March 1942, and inactivated on 10 June 1944.

== History ==
It was assigned to Twelfth Air Force in August 1942 and transferred, without personnel and equipment, to RAF High Wycombe in Buckinghamshire in the United Kingdom where the command was re-formed. Moved to North Africa, with the first of its elements arriving during the invasion in November 1942. Served in combat in the Mediterranean theater until 1 November 1943 when most of the personnel were withdrawn and reassigned to Fifteenth Air Force. Received additional personnel in January 1944 and served in combat until 1 March 1944. It was finally disbanded in Corsica on 10 June 1944.

Joseph Heller's novel Catch 22 draws on his experiences with the 340th Bombardment Group, part of XII Bomber Command.

== Lineage ==
- Constituted as the 12th Bomber Command on 16 February 1942

Activated on 13 March 1942
Redesignated XII Bomber Command c. 24 September 1942
Disbanded on 10 June 1944

=== Assignments ===
- Third Air Force, 13 March 1942
- Twelfth Air Force, 31 August 1942 (Attached to VIII Bomber Command September 1942 – c. 16 October 1942)
- Northwest African Air Forces, February 1943 (attached to Northwest African Strategic Air Force (later Strategic Air Force, Mediterranean Allied Air Forces)
- Twelfth Air Force, 1943 – 10 June 1944

=== Stations ===
- MacDill Field, Florida, 13 March 1942
- RAF High Wycombe (AAF-101), United Kingdom, 31 August-10 November 1942
- Tafaraoui Airfield, Algeria, 22 November 1942
- Algiers, Algeria, 27 November 1942
- Constantine Airfield, Algeria, 5 December 1942
- Tunis, Tunisia, 23 July 1943
- Bari Airfield, Italy, c. December 1943
- Pollena Trocchia (Naples), Italy, 4 January 1944
- Corsica, c. April-10 June 1944

=== Components ===
Wings

- 5th Bombardment Wing, 13 October 1942 – 1 November 1943
- 7th Fighter Wing (later 47th Bombardment Wing), 7 January – 18 February 1943; 1 September – 1 November 1943
- 42d Bombardment Wing, 1 September – 1 November 1943
- 57th Bombardment Wing, 1 January – 1 March 1944

Groups

- 1st Fighter Group, 24 December 1942 – 18 February 1943; 1 September 1943 – 1 November 1943
- 2nd Bombardment Group, 1 September 1943 – 1 November 1943
- 3d Photographic Group, 16 October 1942 – 5 January 1943
- 12th Bombardment Group, 2 January – c. 21 March 1944
- 14th Fighter Group, 11 December 1942 – January 1943
- 21st Bombardment Group, 2–8 May 1942
- 46th Bombardment Group, 2–8 May 1942
- 48th Bombardment Group, 2–8 May 1942
- 68th Reconnaissance Group: 18 October – 1 November 1943 (attached to 5th Bombardment Wing after 31 October 1943)
- 85th Bombardment Group, 16 March - 2 May 1942
- 86th Bombardment Group: 1 May – 21 July 1942
- 97th Bombardment Group: 14 September 1942 – January 1943
- 98th Bombardment Group: 19–24 September 1943
- 301st Bombardment Group: 14 September 1942 – January 1943
- 310th Bombardment Group: 2 May 1942 – 18 February 1943 (attached to 7th Fighter Wing after 1 February 1943)
- 312th Bombardment Group, 2 May – 10 August 1942
- 319th Bombardment Group: c. 11 November 1942 – 1 June 1943
