= 55th Air Refueling Squadron =

US Air Force unit

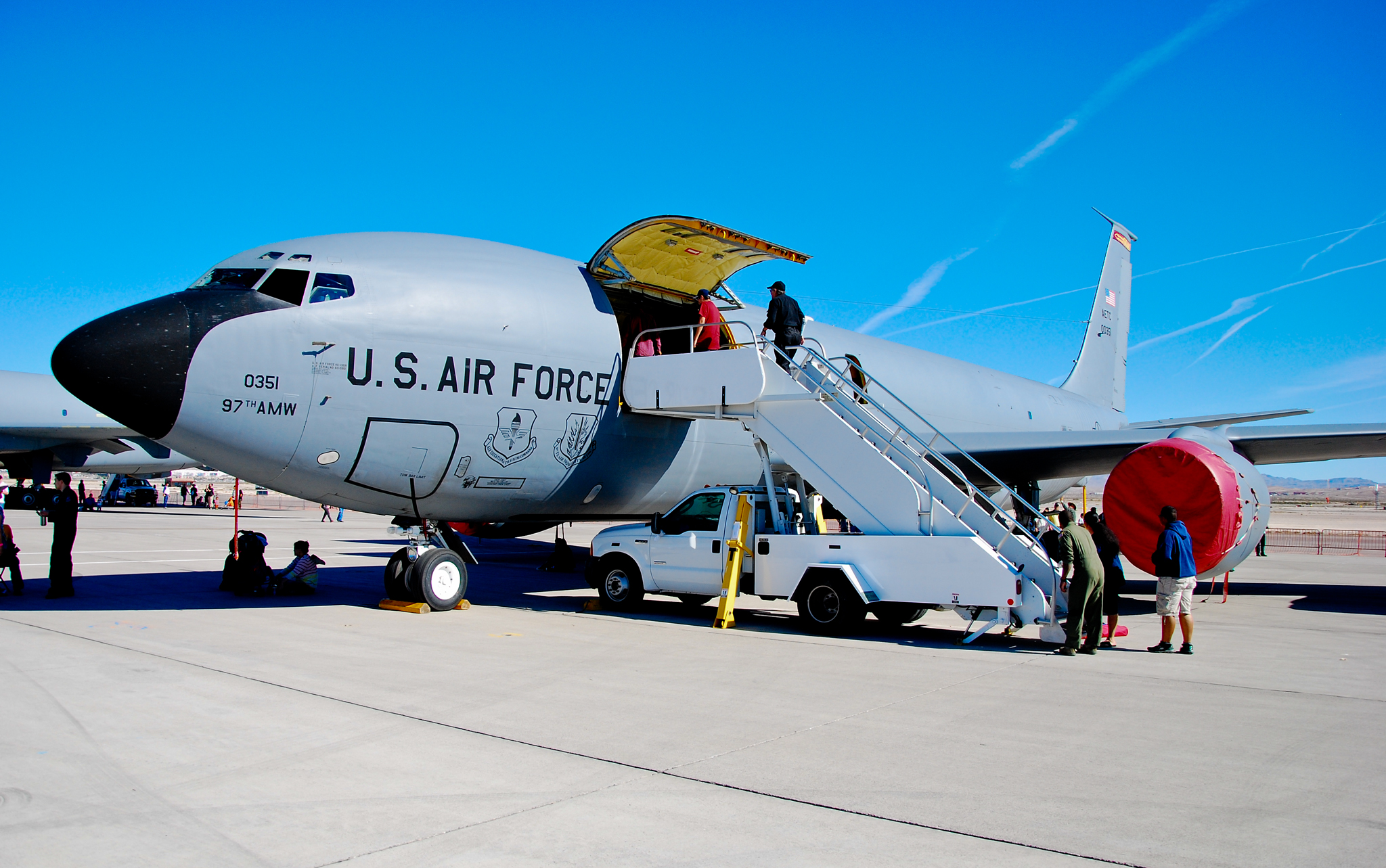
- 97th Air Mobility Wing KC-135 Stratotanker (Note: Aircraft is Boeing KC-135A-BN, serial 60-0351, converted to KC-135R-BN. Baugher, Joe (11 June 2023). "1960 USAF Serial Numbers". Joe Baugher.)
- Active: 1943–1945; 1950–1954; 1955–1963; 1994–2009
- Country: United States
- Branch: United States Air Force
- Role: Aerial refueling
- Motto: Masters of the Art
- Engagements: European Theater of Operations
- Decorations: Air Force Outstanding Unit Award

Insignia
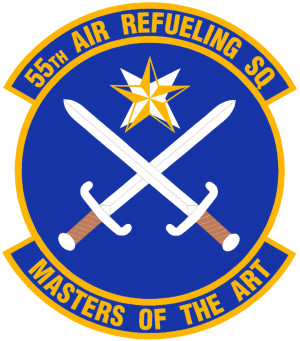
- 55th Air Refueling Squadron emblem (Note: Approved 13 April 1995.)

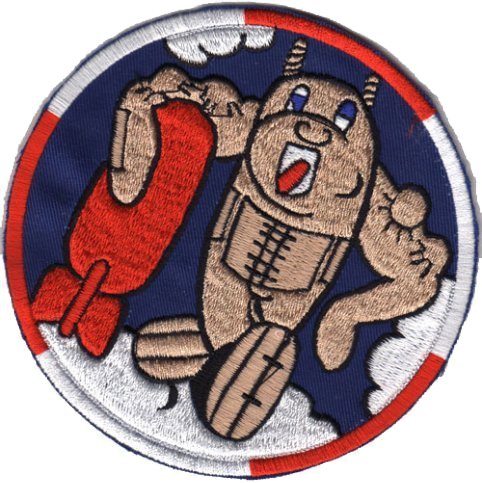
- Patch with 755th Bombardment Squadron emblem (Note: Approved 20 March 1945. Description: On a light turquoise blue disc, within a border of six segments, alternative red and white, a caricatured, nonchalant, camouflaged, B-24 aircraft standing affronte, on a white cloud formation in base and resting right wing tip on nose of upturned, red aerial bomb.)
- World War II fuselage code: J3

The 55th Air Refueling Squadron is an inactive United States Air Force unit. It formerly operated both the combat crew training school and central flight instructor course for Boeing KC-135 Stratotanker at Altus Air Force Base, Oklahoma.

The squadron's first predecessor was the 755th Bombardment Squadron, which was first activated in July 1943. After training with Consolidated B-24 Liberator heavy bombers in the United States, it deployed to the European Theater of Operations, where it participated in the strategic bombing campaign against Germany. Following V-E Day, the squadron returned to the United States, where it began training with Boeing B-29 Superfortresses, but was inactivated in October 1945.

The 55th Air Refueling Squadron was activated in 1950 as a Boeing KB-29 air refueling unit. It flew these early tankers until inactivating in 1954. The squadron was again activated in 1955 with Boeing KC-97 tankers, primarily supporting the Boeing B-47 Stratojets of the 55th Strategic Reconnaissance Wing. It was again inactivated in 1963. The squadron was activated in the training role at Altus in 1994, continuing its mission until inactivating in 2009.

== History ==
=== World War II ===
==== Training in the United States ====
The squadron's first predecessor, the 755th Bombardment Squadron was activated at Wendover Field, Utah on 1 July 1943 as one of the four original squadrons of the 458th Bombardment Group. Before the month ended, the squadron moved to Gowen Field, Idaho, drawing its initial cadre from the 411th Bombardment Squadron. The air echelon of the squadron's cadre immediately departed for Orlando Army Air Base, where they spent the next two months participating in specialized tactical training. In September 1943, the air and ground echelons of the squadron were united at Kearns Army Air Base, Utah before proceeding to Wendover to begin the first phase of training with the Consolidated B-24 Liberator.

At Wendover, most of the initial combat crews were assigned to the squadron. By the end of the year, the squadron completed its training and began moving to the European Theater of Operations. The ground echelon departed its final training base, Tonopah Army Air Field, Nevada, for the port of embarkation on 29 December 1943, sailing for England on the USS Florence Nightingale (AP-70). The air echelon assembled at Hamilton Field, then ferried its Liberators to England via the southern ferry route.

==== Combat in Europe ====
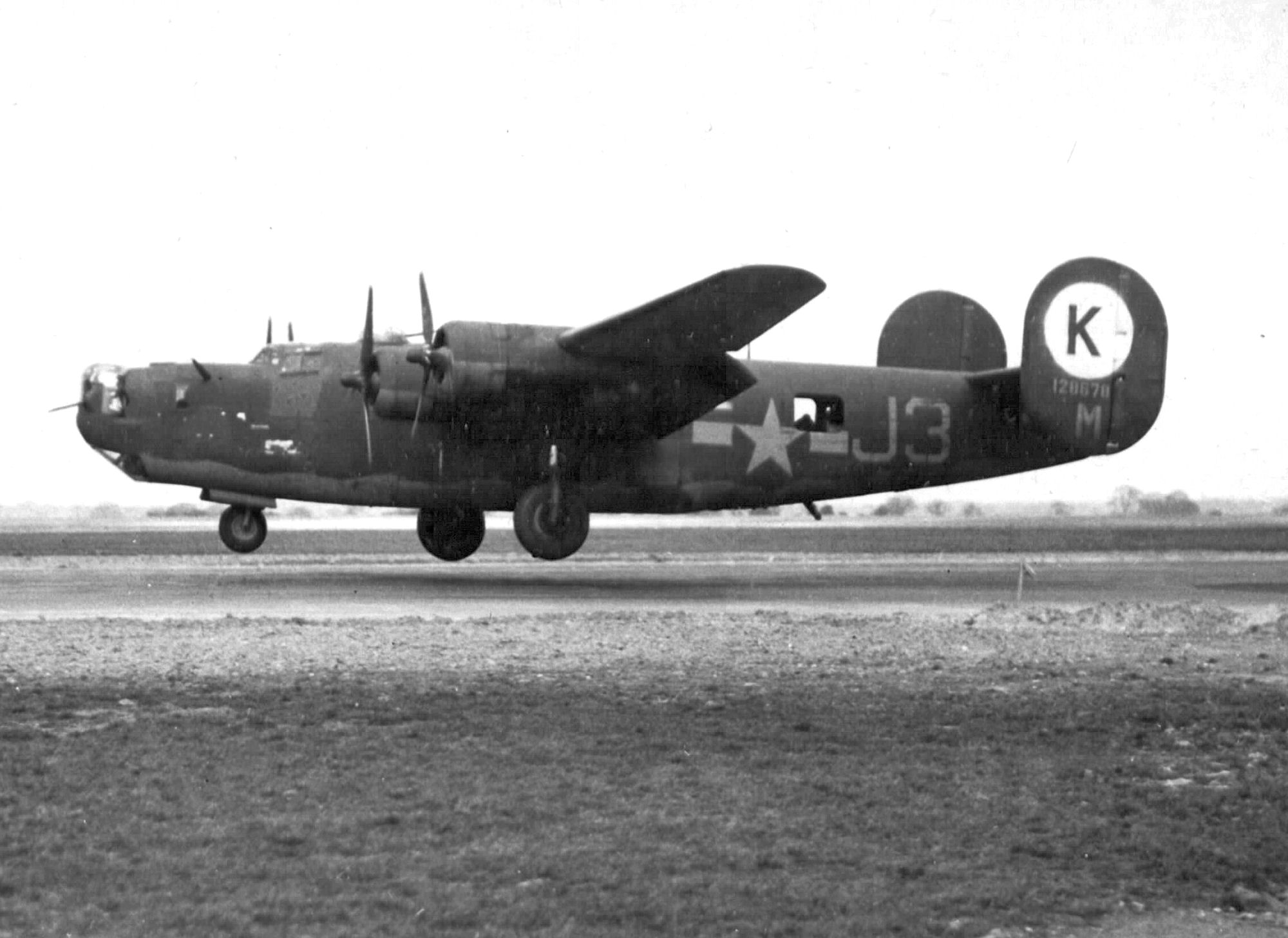
Squadron B-24 Liberator taking off from RAF Horsham St Faith (Note: Aircraft is Douglas Aircraft built Consolidated B-24H-10-DT Liberator, serial 41-28678, J3-M. This aircraft was lost due to mechanical failure on 22 March 1944 mission to bomb the BMW engine factory at Basdorf. Eight of the crew became Prisoners of War and one was killed. Baugher, Joe (18 April 2023). "1941 USAF Serial Numbers". Joe Baugher. Missing Air Crew Report 3555.)

The squadron arrived at its combat station, RAF Horsham St. Faith on 1 February 1944, although the last bombers of the 458th Group did not arrive until 16 February. It entered the strategic bombing campaign against Germany during Big Week, but its first missions, flown on 24 and 25 February 1944, were diversionary missions, not strikes against the German aircraft manufacturing industry. On 2 March it began flying strategic bombardment missions. Its targets included an aircraft manufacturing plant at Brandenburg an der Havel, an airfield near Braunschweig, a fuel depot at Dulmen, oil refineries near Hamburg, marshalling yards at Hamm, an aircraft engine manufacturing factory at Magdeburg, the shipping canal at Minden, aircraft factories at Oschersleben and the industrial area of Saarbrücken.

The squadron was occasionally diverted from the strategic bombing campaign to conduct air interdiction and close air support missions. It helped prepare for Operation Overlord, the invasion of Normandy, by striking artillery batteries, V-1 flying bomb and V-2 rocket launching sites, and airfields in France. On D-Day, it attacked coastal defenses to support the amphibious landings. Afterward, it attacked lines of communication to prevent the movement of enemy personnel and materiel from reaching the battlefield. It attacked enemy troops during Operation Cobra, the breakout from the beachhead through Saint Lo, in late July. It also flew support missions during the Battle of the Bulge in December 1944 and January 1945 and during Operation Varsity, the airborne attacks across the Rhine, in April 1945. In addition, The squadron stopped its bombing during September 1944 to transport gasoline to airfields in France to supply Third Army, which had outrun its supply lines (called Operation Truckin'). These supply flights were not considered combat missions. The squadron flew its last combat mission on 24 April 1945.

The 755th also had the distinction of being the test squadron for the Army Air Forces' first guided bomb project. In May 1944, ten modified B-24s capable of launching Azon bombs were delivered to the 458th Group. On 31 May 1944, the squadron conducted a raid against several bridges in Normandy, the first use of the Azon bombs in combat.

==== Return and inactivation ====
During May 1945, the squadron flew "Trolley" missions. These missions transported ground personnel of the unit over target areas on the continent to permit them to see the results of their contributions to the squadron mission. The squadron returned to the United States in June 1945, with aircraft beginning to depart for Bradley Field, Connecticut on 14 June. The ground echelon sailed on the RMS Queen Mary on 6 July. The squadron assembled at Sioux Falls Army Air Field, South Dakota in July. At Sioux Falls, all personnel who had not been discharged were transferred to other units.

The squadron reformed at Walker Army Air Field, Kansas, moving to March Field, California in August, once the group had achieved 20% manning. At March, it trained with the Boeing B-29 Superfortress very heavy bomber, but never approached authorized manning. It was inactivated there in October 1945.

=== Air refueling operations ===
==== Initial activation ====
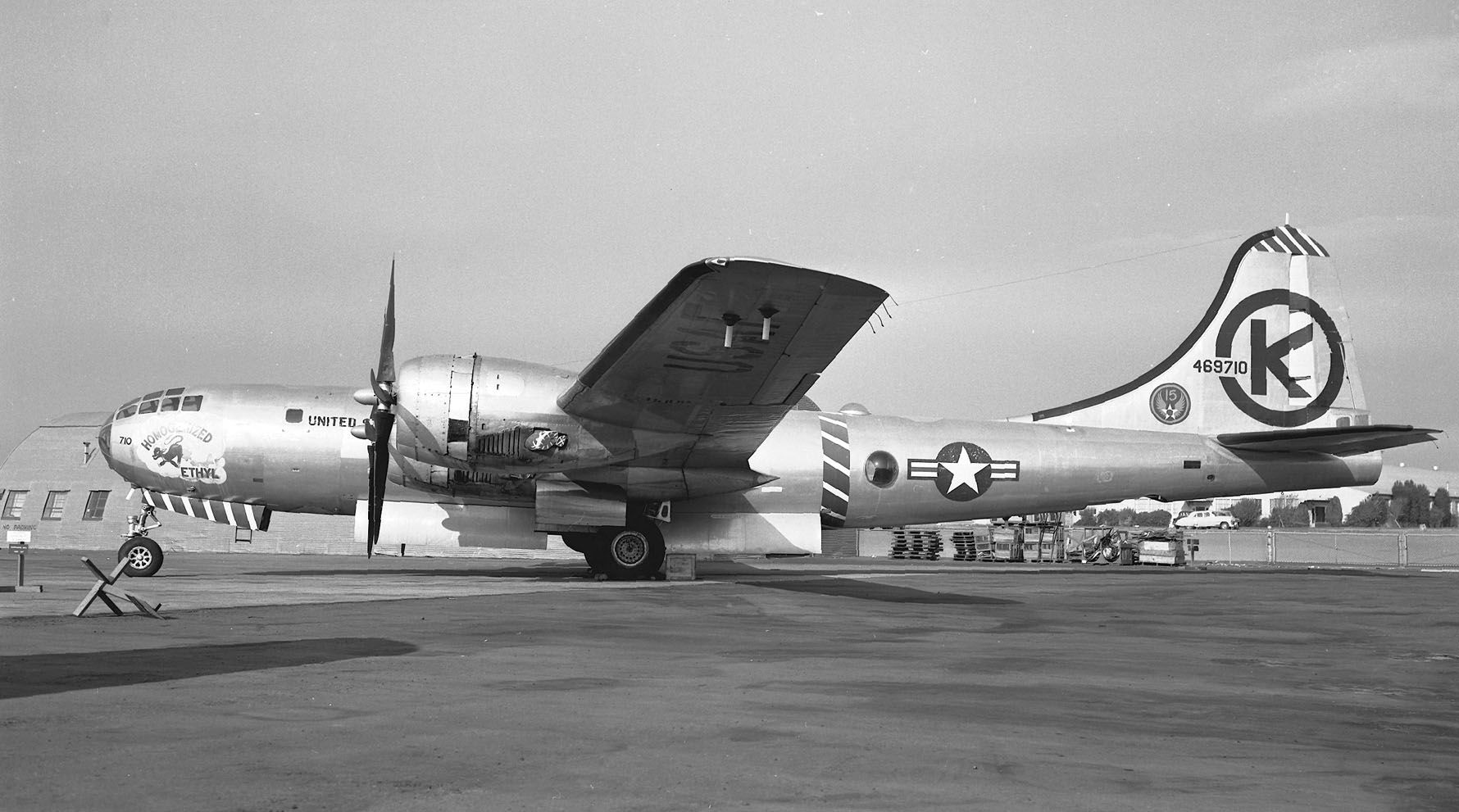
Boeing KB-29 as flown by the squadron

The squadron's second predecessor, the 55th Air Refueling Squadron, was activated on 1 November 1950. It was originally equipped with Boeing KB-29 tankers and was assigned to the 55th Strategic Reconnaissance Group at Ramey Air Force Base, Puerto Rico. On 10 October 1952, the squadron moved to Forbes Air Force Base, Kansas as part of the 55th Strategic Reconnaissance Wing. Two years later, on 16 February 1954, the squadron moved to Lincoln Air Force Base, Nebraska, where it was inactivated two days later, as its personnel and equipment were transferred to the 98th Air Refueling Squadron, which was simultaneously activated.

==== KC-97 era ====
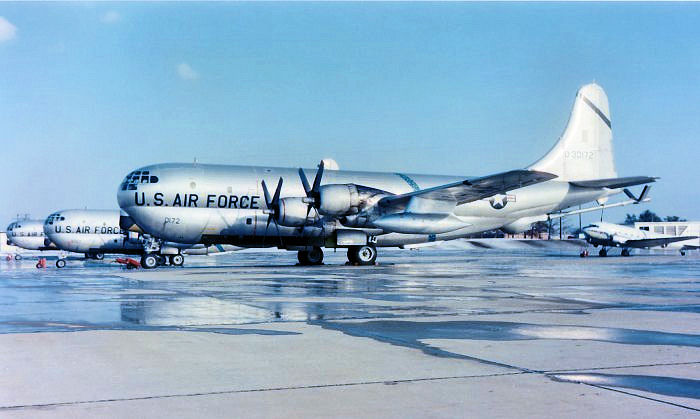
Boeing KC-97s as flown by the squadron

The 55th Air Refueling Squadron was again activated on 1 October 1955, and assigned to the 55th Strategic Reconnaissance Wing at Forbes Air Force Base. It was equipped with Boeing KC-97 Stratofreighter aircraft. First introduced into the Air Force inventory in 1951, the tanker could fly fast enough to refuel the Boeing B-47 Stratojet bomber, thus providing the Air Force with an intercontinental strike capability.

The squadron deployed to Ernest Harmon Air Force Base, Newfoundland, from 31 October through 27 December 1956 in response to the Suez Crisis. During this period, the squadron participated in giant simulated combat missions involving 1,000 B-47s and KC-97s, demonstrating the United States' resolve and intercontinental war fighting capability. The deployment was instrumental in the squadron winning an Air Force Outstanding Unit Award for the period July 1956 to November 1957. During the 1959 Strategic Air Command bombing competition, the largest held to date, the 55th again demonstrated its combat readiness by winning the Saunders Trophy as the best air refueling unit in Strategic Air Command. The squadron was inactivated again in 1963.

==== Tanker training ====
On 28 October 1994, the 55th was activated as part of the 97th Air Mobility Wing at Altus Air Force Base, Oklahoma. The squadron's mission was training active duty, Air National Guard, reserve, and international KC-135 crewmembers. The 55th Air Refueling Squadron, along with the 54th Air Refueling Squadron, were once the only two Air Education and Training Command Boeing KC-135R Stratotanker flying training squadrons. Both squadrons provided KC-135R initial and advanced flight qualification. On 1 April 2009, the 55th Air Refueling Squadron was inactivated, leaving the 54th as the lone remaining KC-135 training unit.

== Lineage ==
755th Bombardment Squadron

- Constituted as the 755th Bombardment Squadron (Heavy) on 19 May 1943

Activated on 1 July 1943.
Redesignated 755th Bombardment Squadron, Heavy on 20 August 1943
Redesignated 755th Bombardment Squadron, Very Heavy on 5 August 1945
Inactivated on 17 Oct 1945

- Consolidated with the 55th Air Refueling Squadron as the 55th Air Refueling Squadron on 19 September 1985

55th Air Refueling Squadron

- Constituted as the 55th Air Refueling Squadron, Medium on 22 November 1950

Activated on 1 November 1950
Inactivated on 18 February 1954

- Activated on 1 October 1955

Discontinued and inactivated on 15 March 1963

- Consolidated with the 755th Bombasrdment Squadron and redesignated 55th Air Refueling Squadron, Heavy on 19 September 1985
- Redesignated 55th Air Refueling Squadron on 31 May 1994

Activated on 28 October 1994
Inactivated 1 April 2009

=== Assignments ===
- 458th Bombardment Group, 1 July 1943 – 17 October 1945
- 55th Strategic Reconnaissance Group, 1 November 1950 (attached to 55th Strategic Reconnaissance Wing after 8 January 1951)
- 55th Strategic Reconnaissance Wing, 16 June 1952 – 18 February 1954
- 55th Strategic Reconnaissance Wing, 1 October 1955 – 15 March 1963 (attached to Eighth Air Force, 31 October–27 December 1956)
- 97th Operations Group, 28 Oct 1994 – 1 April 2009

=== Stations ===
- Wendover Field, Utah, 1 July 1943
- Gowen Field, Idaho, 28 July 1943
- Kearns Army Air Base, Utah, 10 September 1943
- Wendover Field, Utah, 15 September 1943
- Tonopah Army Air Field, Nevada, 4 November 1943 – 1 January 1944
- RAF Horsham St Faith (Station 123), England, 1 February 1944 – 3 July 1945
- Sioux Falls Army Air Field, South Dakota, 15 July 1945
- Walker Army Air Field, Kansas, 25 July 1945
- March Field, California, 22 August–17 October 1945
- Ramey Air Force Base, Puerto Rico, 1 November 1950 – 9 October 1952
- Forbes Air Force Base, Kansas, 10 October 1952
- Lincoln Air Force Base, Nebraska, 16–18 February 1954
- Forbes Air Force Base, Kansas, 1 October 1955 – 15 March 1963 (deployed to Ernest Harmon Air Force Base, Newfoundland 31 October–27 December 1956)
- Altus Air Force Base, Oklahoma, 28 Oct 1994 – 1 April 2009

=== Aircraft ===
- Consolidated B-24 Liberator (1943–1945)
- Boeing B-29 Superfortress (1945)
- Boeing KB-29 Superfortress (1950–1954)
- Boeing KC-97 Stratofreighter (1955–1963)
- Boeing KC-135 Stratotanker (1994–2009)

=== Awards and campaigns ===
Award streamer	Award	Dates	Notes
	Air Force Outstanding Unit Award	July 1956-November 1957	55th Air Refueling Squadron

Campaign Streamer	Campaign	Dates	Notes
	Air Offensive, Europe	1 February 1944 – 5 June 1944	755th Bombardment Squadron
	Air Combat, EAME Theater	1 February 1944 – 11 May 1945	755th Bombardment Squadron
	Normandy	6 June 1944 – 24 July 1944	755th Bombardment Squadron
	Northern France	25 July 1944 – 14 September 1944	755th Bombardment Squadron
	Rhineland	15 September 1944 – 21 March 1945	755th Bombardment Squadron
	Ardennes-Alsace	16 December 1944 – 25 January 1945	755th Bombardment Squadron
	Central Europe	22 March 1944 – 21 May 1945	755th Bombardment Squadron
