= 97th Operations Group =

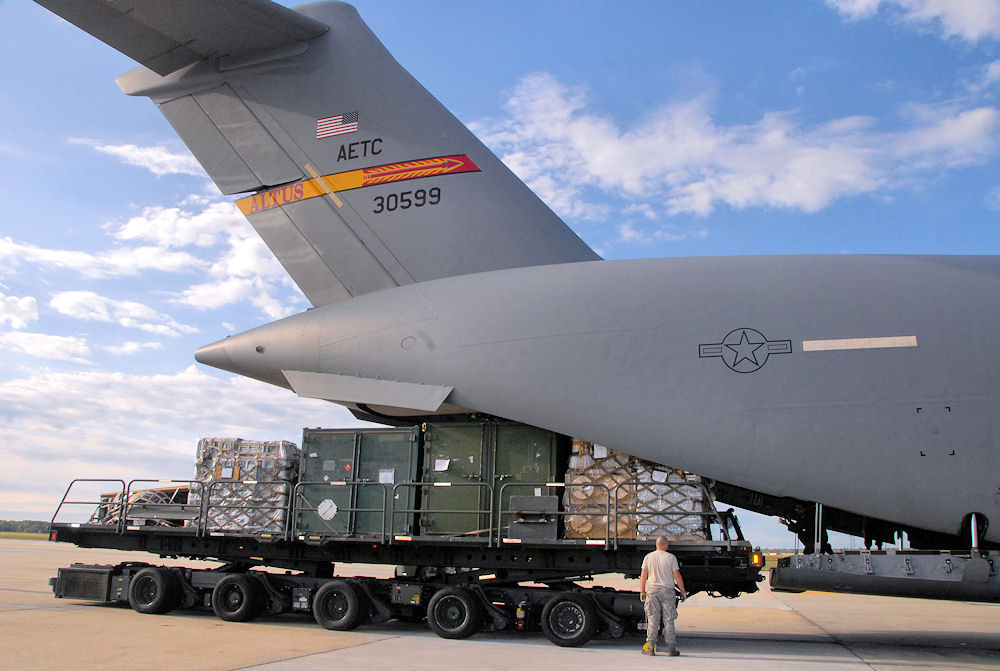
- An airman from the 305th Aerial Port Squadron, McGuire Air Force Base, N.J., helps load a C-17 Globemaster III flown by a crew assigned to the 58th Airlift Squadron, Altus AFB, Oklahoma
- Active: 1942–1945; 1946–1952; 1991–1992; 1992–present
- Country: United States
- Branch: United States Air Force
- Engagements: World War II - EAME Theater

- Decorations: Distinguished Unit Citation (2x); Air Force Outstanding Unit Award (13x)

Commanders
- Notable commanders: Frank A. Armstrong

Insignia
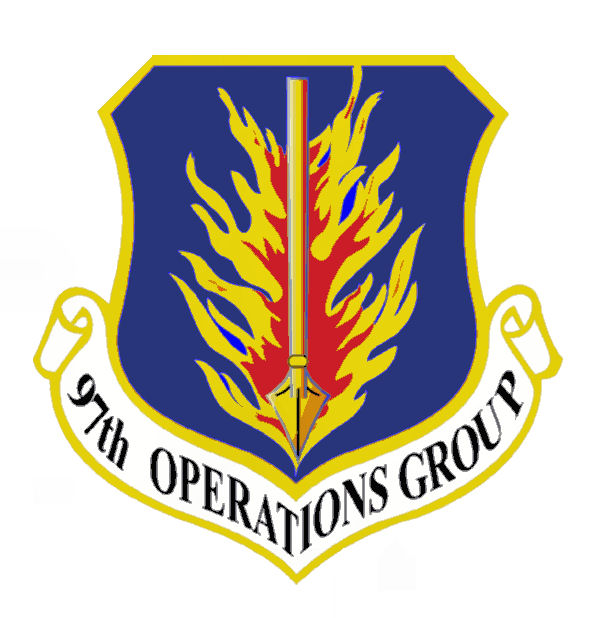
- 97th Operations Group emblem

The 97th Operations Group is a United States Air Force unit assigned to the 97th Air Mobility Wing of Air Education and Training Command. It is stationed at Altus Air Force Base, Oklahoma.

Col. Cornelius Walter "Connie" Cousland served as the first commander of the 97th Bombardment Group once activated on 3 February 1942 at MacDill Field in Tampa, Florida through 29 July 1942 at Polebrook Field in England; and was replaced by Col. Frank Alton Armstrong, Jr. on 31 July 1942. During World War II the 97th Bombardment Group flew its first mission on 17 August 1942. It was the first Boeing B-17 Flying Fortress bombardment group to fly a mission from the United Kingdom against a European target, the marshalling yards at Sotteville-lès-Rouen in France. In late 1942 the group moved to the Mediterranean Theater of Operations, where it earned two Distinguished Unit Citations for missions against Steyr, Austria and Ploiești, Romania. The group was inactivated in Italy on 29 October 1945.

In the postwar era, the 97th was assigned to Strategic Air Command (SAC) in August 1946, assuming the personnel and Boeing B-29 Superfortresses of the 485th Bombardment Group at Smoky Hill Army Air Field, Kansas. Following a four-month deployment to Alaska, the group moved to Biggs Air Force Base, Texas, where it converted to the improved Boeing B-50 Superfortress. The group became non-operational in February 1951 and was inactivated in June 1952 when its squadrons were assigned directly to its parent, the 97th Bombardment Wing, as SAC reorganized from the wing base organization to the dual deputy wing organization.

The group was redesignated the 97th Operations Group and activated at Eaker Air Force Base, Arkansas on 1 September 1991 when the 97th Wing adopted the USAF Objective Wing organization plan. Under SAC, the group operated Boeing B-52 Stratofortress bombers until January 1992 and Boeing KC-135 Stratotankers until inactivating in April 1992.

The group was activated in October 1992, absorbing the personnel and aircraft of the 443d Operations Group at Altus Air Force Base, Oklahoma. The unit was assigned to the 97th Air Mobility Wing. At Altus, the group became the airlift and air refueling training group for Air Mobility Command. In 1993, it transferred to the Air Education and Training Command, continuing the same mission.

== Overview ==
The 97th Operations Group is the flying component of the 97th Air Mobility Wing. It plans and executes C-17, KC-46, and KC-135 formal-school initial and advanced specialty training programs for up to 3,000 students annually. It also sustains C-17, KC-46, and KC-135 airland, airdrop and air-refueling mobility forces providing global reach for combat and contingency operations as well as providing air traffic control and weather forecasting for flying operations.

== Units ==
The 97th Operations Group (tail flash "Altus") consists of the following squadrons:

- 97th Operations Support Squadron

Activated as the 1709th Training Squadron under the 1707th Air Transport Group in September 1952 at Palm Beach AFB, Florida. Currently, the squadron provides direct mission support to all operational units assigned to the 97th Air Mobility Wing. Provides air traffic services, weather, airfield management, intelligence, life support, tactics, flight records, scheduling, and current operations services. Manages and provides administrative support for active duty, reserves, and international students at the command's airlift and tanker training center.

- 97th Training Squadron

Manages the 97th Air Mobility Wing's $1.01-billion contracted aircrew training program for more than 350-plus assigned instructors and as many as 2,100 C-17 and KC-135 students.

- 54th Air Refueling Squadron (KC-135R)

Provides KC-135R initial and advanced flight qualification

- 56th Air Refueling Squadron (KC-46)

Provides KC-46 initial and advanced flight qualification

- 58th Airlift Squadron (C-17)

The nation's only formal C-17 combat crew training school, providing pilot and loadmaster initial qualification and advanced upgrades for all United States active duty, reserve, and guard units.

== History ==
For related history and lineage, see 97th Air Mobility Wing

=== World War II ===
Media related to 97th Bombardment Group (United States Army Air Forces) at Wikimedia Commons

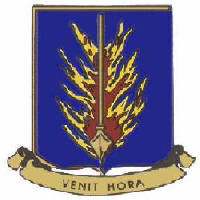
Emblem of the 97th Bombardment Group

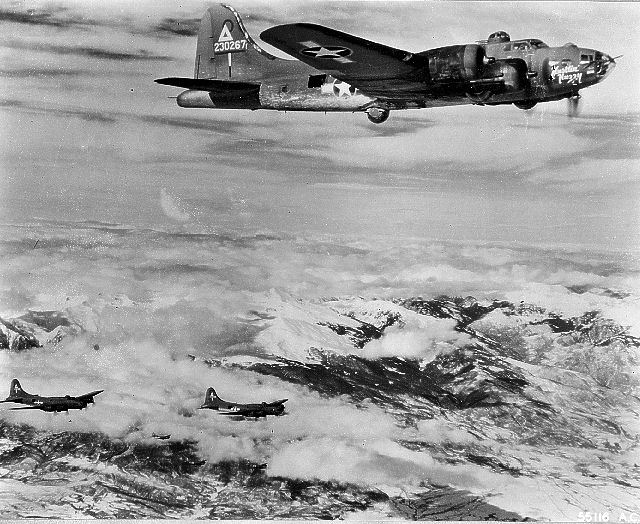
B-17 of the 97th Bomb Group in early Fifteenth Air Force identification markings

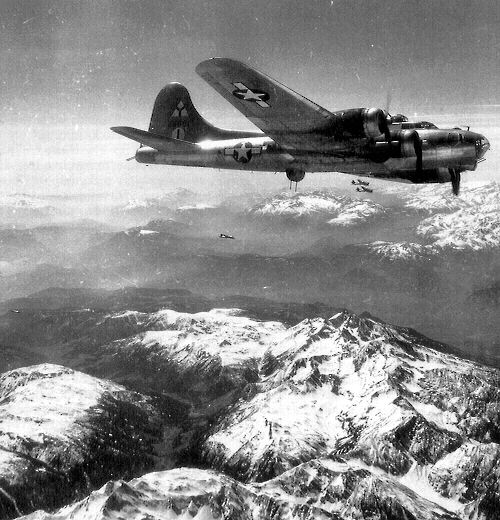
B-17 of the 97th Bomb Group in later Fifteenth Air Force markings

The group was established early in 1942 and initially trained B-17 Flying Fortress crews in Florida and flew antisubmarine patrols. It deployed to England as part of Operation Bolero and became the first operationally-ready Eighth Air Force B-17 Flying Fortress group.

Combat operations by the group began on 17 August 1942, when the 97th Bomb Group flew the first Eighth Air Force heavy-bomber mission of the war, attacking the railway marshalling yards at Sotteville-lès-Rouen in France. The mission included 18 bombers - 12 to attack the yards and six to fly a diversion along the coast.

The lead aircraft of the first flight group, Butcher Shop, was piloted by the group commander, Colonel Frank A. Armstrong, and co-piloted by 340th squadron commander, Captain Paul W. Tibbets, who later flew the Enola Gay to Hiroshima, Japan, on the first atomic bombing mission.

In the lead aircraft of the second flight group, Yankee Doodle, flew General Ira C. Eaker, the commanding general of the Eighth Air Force Bomber Command, piloted by 414th squadron commander Captain Rudolph Emil Flack, who was the Grafton Underwood base commander and mission commander. The RAF supplied a heavy fighter escort: four squadrons of Spitfires escorted the 12 B-17s to the target while five more covered the withdrawal. About half of the bombs landed in the target area.

The 97th Bomb Group conducted a total of 16 missions from Grafton Underwood and Polebrook, attacking airfields, railroad marshalling yards, war industries, naval installations, and other Axis targets in France and the Low Countries. The group sortied 247 aircraft, dropped 395 tons of bombs on Nazi-controlled territory, and lost 14 aircraft.

On 21 October 1942, a month earlier than its previously scheduled movement as part of Operation Torch, and because of delays in the movement of medium-bombardment forces, the 97th Bomb Group was transferred to the Mediterranean theater upon the availability of bases in North Africa. The unit was assigned first to Twelfth Air Force and later (November 1943) to Fifteenth Air Force.

From 16 November 1942 through May 1943, B-17s struck shipping in the Mediterranean Sea as well as airfields, docks, harbors, and marshalling yards in North Africa, Southern France, Sardinia, Sicily, and the southern Italian mainland in a campaign to cut supply lines to German forces in North Africa. Helped force the capitulation of Pantelleria Island in June 1943. Bombed in preparation for and in support of the invasions of Sicily and southern Italy in the summer and fall of 1943.

From November 1943 to April 1945, the unit attacked targets in Italy, France, Germany, Czechoslovakia, Austria, Hungary, Rumania, Bulgaria, Yugoslavia, and Greece, attacking oil refineries, marshalling yards, aircraft factories, and other strategic objectives.

The unit earned a Distinguished Unit Citation (DUC) for leading a raid against an aircraft factory at Steyr on 24 February 1944 during "Big Week," the intensive air campaign against the German aircraft industry.

The unit participated in first shuttle-bombing mission to Russia (Operation Frantic) in June 1944. The group earned a second DUC for a devastating raid against one of the Ploiești oil refineries in Rumania on 18 August 1944. The unit supported Allied forces at Anzio and Cassino by bombing enemy communications, transportation targets, and airfields. The unit bombed coastal defenses in preparation for the invasion of Southern France and assisted the American Fifth and British Eighth armies in their advance through the Po Valley of Northern Italy until the German surrender in May 1945.

The 97th Bomb Group flew 467 combat missions, in which 110 aircraft were lost.

=== Cold War ===
The unit was redesignated as the 97th Bombardment Group (very heavy) and was reactivated at Smoky Hill AAFld (later, Smoky Hill AFB), Kansas on 4 August 1946.

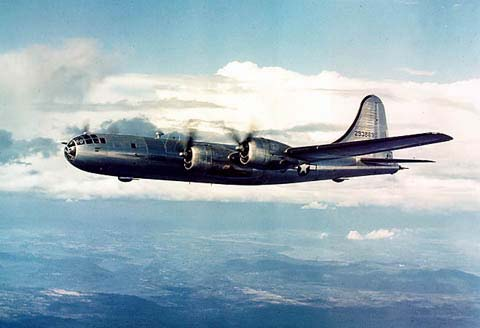
Boeing B-29 Superfortress

It was assigned to Strategic Air Command (SAC) and was equipped with B-29 Superfortresses. The operational squadrons of the 97th Bomb Group were the 340th, 341st and 342d bomb squadrons.

The group participated in numerous exercises, operational readiness inspections, and overseas deployments. Deployed to Mile 26 Field, northern Alaska (winter of 1947–1948), to provide a strategic-bombing force east of the Bering Straits. The group was assigned to the newly established 97th Bombardment Wing on 1 December 1947. The group deployed twice to the United Kingdom as part of SAC's forward rotation of B-29 groups to Europe.

The group was left unmanned from 10 February 1951 to 16 June 1952 after its second forward deployment to England. The group was inactivated on 16 June 1952 as SAC reorganized its wings into the dual deputy system.

=== Modern era ===
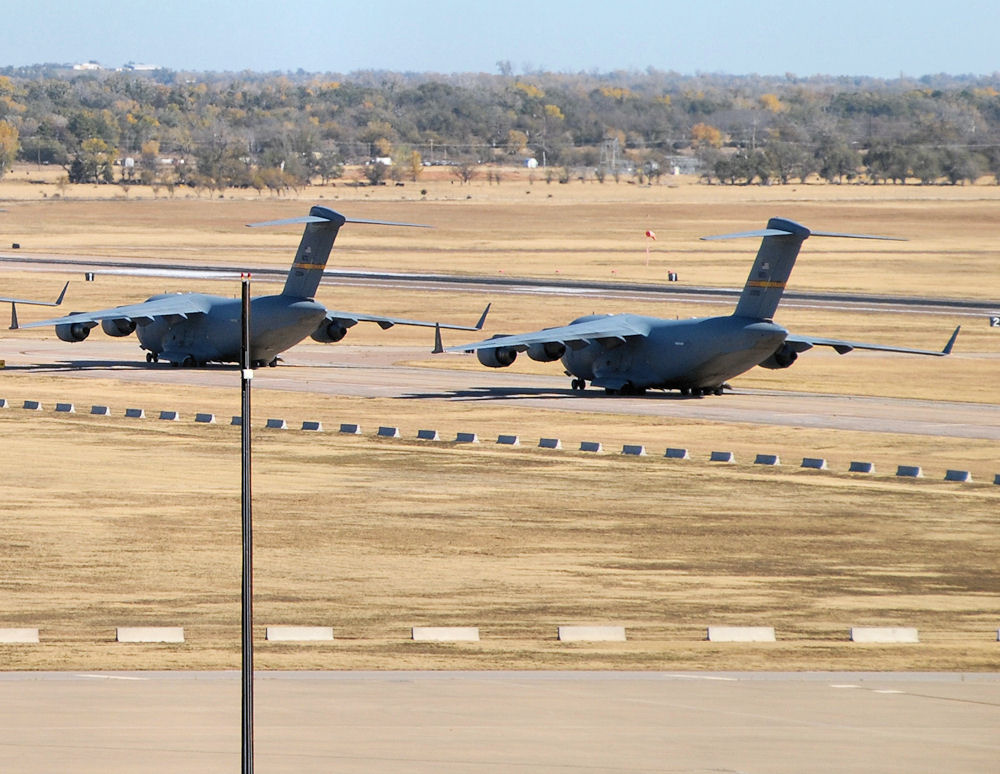
97th OG : C-17 Globemasters take off in rapid succession as part of the mobility air forces exercise

On 29 August 1991, the 97th Bombardment Wing was redesignated as the 97th Wing under the "objective wing" concept adopted by the air force as the lines between tactical and strategic forces blurred. The flying components of the former 97th Bombardment Wing were reassigned to the newly established 97th Operations Group. Upon activation, the 97th Operations Group was bestowed the history, lineage and honors of the 97th Bombardment Group from the 97th Wing.

Between September 1991 and April 1992, the 97th Operations Group flew aerial-refueling missions for Strategic Air Command.

Reassigned to Air Mobility Command between October 1992 and July 1993, the group flew strategic-airlift and aerial-refueling training missions.

After 1 July 1993, supported Air Education and Training Command by training flying crews with strategic-airlift and air-refueling aircraft.

== Lineage ==
- Constituted as 97th Bombardment Group (Heavy) on 28 January 1942

Activated on 3 February 1942
Redesignated 97th Bombardment Group, Heavy, on 30 September 1944
Inactivated on 29 October 1945

- Redesignated 97th Bombardment Group, Very Heavy, on 15 July 1946

Organized and activated on 4 August 1946 from the personnel and equipment of the 485th Bombardment Group (inactivated)
Redesignated 97th Bombardment Group, Medium, on 12 July 1948
Inactivated on 16 June 1952

- Redesignated 97th Operations Group on 29 August 1991

Activated on 1 September 1991
Inactivated on 1 April 1992

- Activated on 1 October 1992

=== Assignments ===
- Third Air Force, 3 February 1942
- VIII Bomber Command, 20 May 1942
- First Bombardment Wing, August 1942
- XII Bomber Command, 14 September 1942
- Fifth Bombardment Wing, January 1943 – c. 29 October 1945
- Fifteenth Air Force, 4 August 1946

Attached to Yukon Sector, Alaskan Air Command, c. 2–30 November 1947

- 97th Bombardment Wing, 4 November 1948 – 15 February 1949

Attached to: Third Air Division, c. 27 July 1950 – 9 February 1951
Not operational, 10 February 1951 – 16 June 1952

- 97th Wing, 1 September 1991 – 1 April 1992
- 97th Air Mobility Wing, 1 October 1992 – present

=== Components ===
Groups

- 401st Bombardment Group: attached 27 June 1949 – 10 February 1951

Squadrons

- 11th Air Refueling Squadron: 1 October 1992 – 1 July 1993
- 54th Air Refueling Squadron: 16 January 1998 – present
- 55th Air Refueling Squadron: 28 October 1994 – March 2009
- 97th Air Refueling Squadron: 1 March 1949 – 16 June 1952 (not operational 1 March 1949 – 23 January 1950; detached 12 July 1950 – 16 June 1952); 1 September 1991 – 1 April 1992
- 306th Air Refueling Squadron: 1 October 1992 – 1 July 1993
- 56th Airlift Squadron (later, 56th Air Refueling): 1 October 1992 – 30 September 2008, 1 August 2016 – present
- 57th Airlift Squadron: 1 October 1992 – 30 September 2001
- 58th Airlift Squadron: 30 January 1996 – present
- 24th Reconnaissance later, 414th Bombardment Squadron: 3 February 1942 – 29 October 1945
- 340th Bombardment Squadron (later, 340th Bomb): 3 February 1942 – 29 October 1945; 4 August 1946 – 16 June 1952 (detached, 10 February 1951 – 16 June 1952); 1 September 1991 – 7 January 1992
- 341st Bombardment Squadron: 3 February 1942 – 29 October 1945; 4 August 1946 – 16 June 1952 (detached 10 February 1951 – 16 June 1952)
- 342d Bombardment Squadron: 3 February 1942 – 29 October 1945; 4 August 1946 – 16 June 1952 (detached 10 February 1951 – 16 June 1952)

=== Stations ===
- MacDill Field, Florida, 3 February 1942
- Sarasota Army Airfield, Florida, 29 March – c. 16 May 1942
- RAF Polebrook (USAAF Station 110), England, c. 13 June –

c. 9 November 1942

- Maison Blanche Airport, Algiers, Algeria, c. 13 November 1942
- Tafaraoui Airfield, Algeria, c. 22 November 1942
- Biskra Airfield, Algeria, c. 25 December 1942
- Chateau-dun-du-Rhumel Airfield, Algeria, c. 8 February 1943
- Pont du Fahs Airfield, Tunisia, c. 1 August 1943
- Depienne Airfield, Tunisia, c. 15 August 1943
- Cerignola Airfield, Italy, c. 20 December 1943
- Amendola Airfield, Italy, 16 January 1944
- Marcianise Airfield, Italy, c. 1 – 29 October 1945
- Smoky Hill AAFld (later, Smoky Hill AFB), Kansas, 4 August 1946

Deployed at Mile 26 Air Field [later, Eielson AFB] , Alaska, 2 November 1947 – 13 March 1948

- Biggs AFB, Texas, 17 May 1948 – 16 June 1952

Deployed at RAF Marham, England, 4 November 1948 – 15 February 1949
Deployed at RAF Sculthorpe, England, c. 27 July 1950 – 9 February 1951

- Eaker AFB, Arkansas, 1 September 1991 – 1 April 1992
- Altus AFB, Oklahoma, 1 October 1992 – present

=== Aircraft ===
- B-17 Flying Fortress, 1942–1945
- B-29 Superfortress, 1946–1950
- KB-29 Superfortress (tanker), 1950–1951
- B-50 Superfortress, 1950–1951
- KC-135 Stratotanker, 1991–1992; 1992–1993; 1994–present
- C-141 Starlifter, 1992–2001
- C-5 Galaxy, 1992–2007
- C-17 Globemaster III, 1996–present
- KC-46 Pegasus, 2019–present

== See also ==
519th Air Service Group Support unit for the group before being replaced upon implementation of the Hobson Plan
