= 58th Airlift Squadron =

58th Airlift Squadron

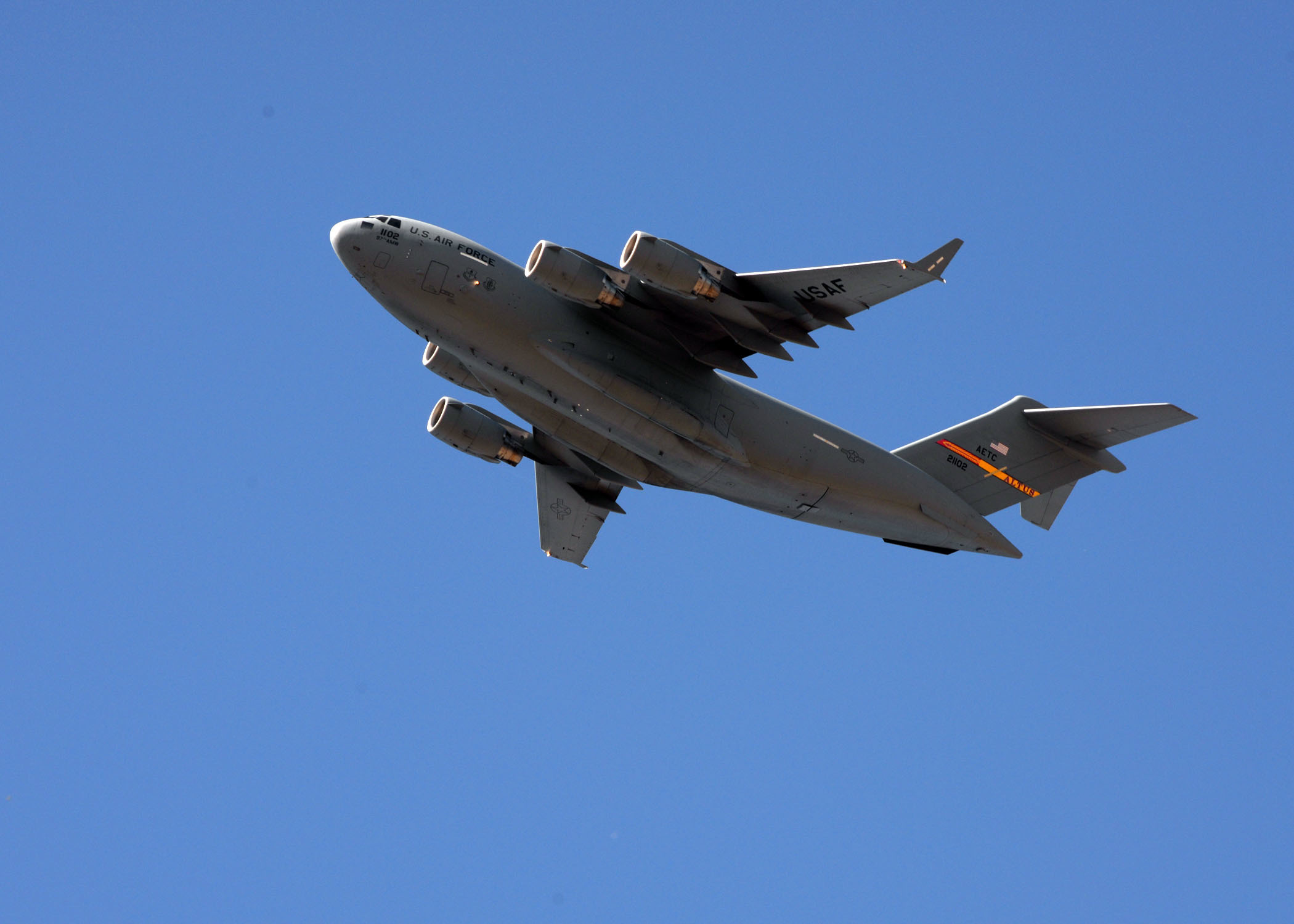
- Squadron C-17 Globemaster III during a joint exercise at Fort Sill
- Active: 1942–1946; 1947–1950; 1965–1971; 1977–1993; 1996–present
- Country: United States
- Branch: United States Air Force
- Role: Airlift Training
- Part of: Air Education and Training Command
- Garrison/HQ: Altus Air Force Base
- Nickname: The Ratpack
- Engagements: Southwest Pacific Theater
- Decorations: Air Force Outstanding Unit Award; Philippine Presidential Unit Citation; Republic of Vietnam Gallantry Cross with Palm

Insignia
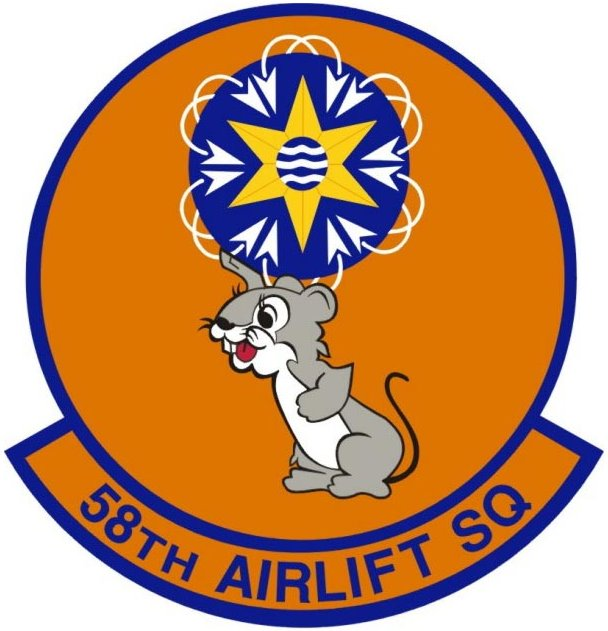
- 58th Airlift Squadron emblem (Note: Approved 26 May 1967.) (Note: When activated in 1966, the squadron replaced the 7th Logistic Support Squadron. It adopted the chipmunk from that squadron's emblem.)

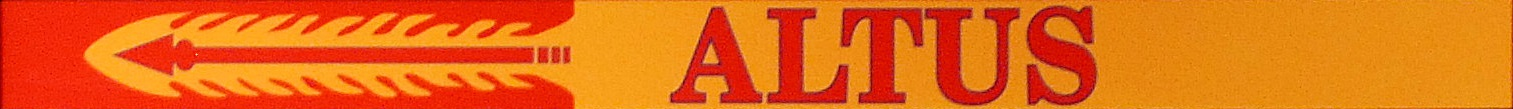
- Tail Flash

The 58th Airlift Squadron is part of the 97th Air Mobility Wing at Altus Air Force Base, Oklahoma. It operates C-17 Globemaster III aircraft training pilots and loadmasters for airlift and airdrop operations.

== Mission ==
The 58 AS is responsible for providing pilot and loadmaster initial qualification and advanced upgrades for all United States active duty, reserve, and guard units.

== History ==
Constituted as 58 Troop Carrier Squadron on 12 Nov 1942. Activated on 18 Nov 1942 with Douglas C-47 Skytrains at Bowman Field, KY. The 58th conducted aerial transportation in Pacific Theater, and participated in the airborne assault on Nadzab, New Guinea, on 5 September 1943 during World War II.

The 58th were inactivated on 25 March 1946. Activated in the Reserve on 28 June 1947. Redesignated as 58 Troop Carrier Squadron, Medium, on 27 June 1949. Inactivated on 3 Oct 1950. Redesignated as 58 Military Airlift Squadron, Special, and activated, on 27 December 1965. Organized on 8 January 1966. Redesignated as 58 Military Airlift Squadron on 8 January 1967, operating Lockheed C-141 Starlifters. Inactivated on 15 August 1971. Activated on 1 September 1977. Redesignated as 58 Airlift Squadron on 1 Jun 1992. Inactivated on 1 Oct 1993. Activated on 30 Jan 1996.

The 58th provided global airlift from 1966 to 1971 and from 1977 to 1993. When it was organized in January 1966, it absorbed the personnel and equipment of the 7th Air Transport Squadron, Special.'

It has conducted Boeing C-17 Globemaster III aircrew training since 30 January 1996, when the stoodup as an Air Education and Training Command squadron.

In September 2005, the 58th helped the victims in Louisiana form Hurricanes Katrina and Rita. They flew over 25 missions helping to supply essential equipment and supplies.

In 2008 the squadron was again called upon to perform multiple evacuations from the Gulf Coast ahead of Hurricanes Gustav and Ike. Sixty percent of the squadron members participated in the effort, flying 55 missions and moving over 1 million pounds of cargo and equipment while evacuating 315 personnel and 100 patients.

== Lineage ==
- Constituted as the 58th Troop Carrier Squadron on 12 November 1942

Activated on 18 November 1942
Inactivated on 25 March 1946

- Activated in the Reserve on 28 June 1947

Redesignated 58th Troop Carrier Squadron, Medium on 27 June 1949
Inactivated on 3 October 1950

- Redesignated 58th Military Airlift Squadron, Special and activated on 27 December 1965 (not organized)

Organized on 8 January 1966
Redesignated 58th Military Airlift Squadron on 8 January 1967
Inactivated on 15 August 1971

- Activated on 1 September 1977

Redesignated 58th Airlift Squadron on 1 June 1992
Inactivated on 1 October 1993
Activated on 30 January 1996

=== Assignments ===
- 375th Troop Carrier Group, 18 November 1942 – 25 March 1946
- Eleventh Air Force, 28 June 1947
- 375th Troop Carrier Group, 30 September 1947 – 3 October 1950
- Military Air Transport Service (later Military Airlift Command), 27 December 1965 (not organized)
- 63d Military Airlift Wing, 8 January 1966
- 436th Military Airlift Wing, 1 July 1966 – 15 August 1971
- 435th Tactical Airlift Wing, 1 September 1977
- 322d Airlift Division, 23 June 1978
- 608th Military Airlift Group, 1 August 1983
- 86th Operations Group, 1 June 1992 – 1 October 1993
- 97th Operations Group, 30 January 1996 – present

=== Stations ===
- Bowman Field, Kentucky, 18 November 1942
- Sedalia Army Air Field, Missouri, 24 January 1943
- Laurinburg-Maxton Army Air Base, North Carolina, 6 May 1943
- Baer Field, Indiana, 1–17 June 1943
- Port Moresby, New Guinea, c. 10 July 1943
- Dobodura Airfield Complex, New Guinea, 19 August 1943
- Port Moresby, New Guinea, 21 December 1943
- Nadzab, New Guinea, 22 April 1944
- Biak, 25 September 1944
- San Jose, Mindoro, 1 March 1945
- Porac, Luzon, Philippines, 20 May 1945
- Okinawa, 20 August 1945
- Tachikawa Airfield, Japan, c. 20 September 1945 – 25 March 1946
- Youngstown Municipal Airport, Ohio, 28 June 1947
- Greater Pittsburgh Airport, Pennsylvania, 27 June 1949 – 3 October 1950
- Robins Air Force Base, Georgia, 8 January 1966 – 15 August 1971
- Ramstein Air Base, Germany, 1 September 1977 – 1 October 1993
- Altus Air Force Base, Oklahoma, 30 January 1996 – present

=== Aircraft ===
- Douglas C-47 Skytrain (1942–1945)
- Boeing B-17 Flying Fortress (1944)
- Curtiss C-46 Commando (1944–1946, 1949–1950)
- North American T-6 Texan (1948)
- Beechcraft AT-11 Kansan (1948)
- Douglas C-124 Globemaster II (1966–1967)
- Lockheed C-141 Starlifter (1967–1971)
- Lockheed VC-140 Jetstar (1977–1986)
- Boeing VC-135 Stratolifter (1977–1993)
- North American CT-39 Sabreliner (1978–1983)
- Beechcraft C-12 Huron (1978–1993)
- Learjet C-21 (1984–1993)
- Gulfstream C-20 (1987–1993)
- Boeing T-43 Bobcat (1988–1993)
- Boeing C-17 Globemaster III (1996 – present)
