= 54th Air Refueling Squadron =

US Air Force unit

54th Air Refueling Squadron

- 54th Air Refueling Squadron KC-135 and instructor pilot
- Active: 1942–1949; 1949–1965; 1972–1997; 1998–present
- Country: United States
- Branch: United States Air Force
- Role: Aerial refueling training
- Part of: Air Education and Training Command
- Garrison/HQ: Altus Air Force Base
- Nickname: Eager Beavers (1956–1965) Jesters
- Decorations: Air Force Outstanding Unit Award

Insignia
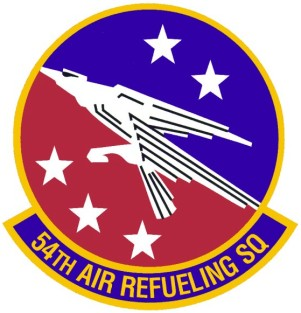
- 54th Air Refueling Squadron emblem (Note: Approved 6 June 1995.)

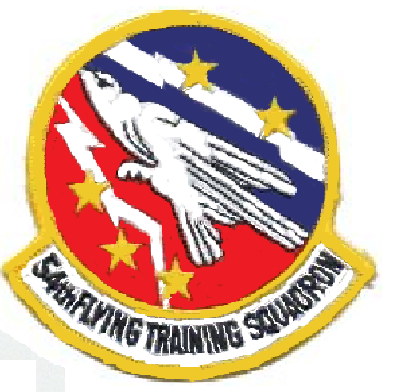
- 54th Flying Training Squadron emblem (Note: Approved 20 February 1973.)

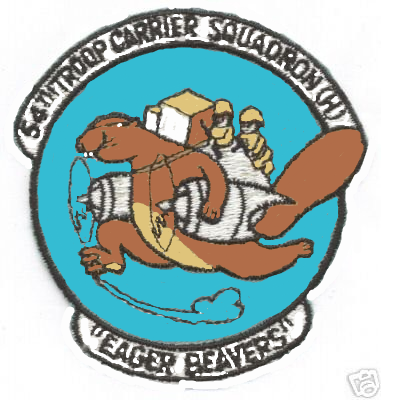
- 54th Troop Carrier Squadron emblem (Note: Approved 18 July 1956. Description: Over and through a light turquoise blue disc, border black, a caricatured beaver brown and tan, leaping through the air, holding an aircraft motor with whirling propeller under each foreleg, and carrying two caricatured paratroopers and two boxes of freight tan and brown, on his back proper; small speed indicator dark brown in base point.)

The 54th Air Refueling Squadron is a United States Air Force unit that is part of the 97th Air Mobility Wing at Altus Air Force Base, Oklahoma. It operates the Boeing KC-135 Stratotanker aircraft conducting air refueling training.

== History ==
=== Airlift operations ===
The 54th Transport Squadron was activated at Hamilton Field, California, but moved to Bowman Field, Kentucky, in June 1942, as the 54th Troop Carrier Squadron. Successive reassignments were to Florence Army Air Field, South Carolina, in August 1942, and to Elmendorf Field, Alaska, until inactivation on 5 March 1949. While there the 54th deployed to Rhein-Main Air Base, Germany, to support the Berlin Airlift.

That inactivation lasted only six months and on 20 September 1949, the unit was activated again at Elmendorf and again moved to Donaldson Air Force Base, South Carolina, in July 1956, remaining in service until 25 June 1965.

=== Pilot training ===
On 14 April 1972, the 54th received a new mission and name. It became the 54th Flying Training Squadron, and was stationed at Reese Air Force Base, Texas, with an official activation date of 1 October. Here personnel trained new pilots in the Northrop T-38 Talon until the 54th was once again inactivated in April 1997.

=== Air refueling training ===
The 54th Air Refueling Squadron was reactivated at its current home of Altus Air Force Base, Oklahoma on 16 January 1998. The 54th Air Refueling Squadron the only Boeing KC-135R Stratotanker flying training squadron in Air Education and Training Command. The squadron provides KC-135R initial and advanced flight qualification. The squadron's mission continues to encompass the training of all active duty, Air National Guard, Air Force Reserve and international KC-135 crew members. Over 70 instructors train 450 pilot and boom operator students annually for the Department of Defense and international customers.

== Lineage ==
- Constituted as the 54th Transport Squadron on 30 May 1942

Activated on 1 June 1942
Redesignated 54th Troop Carrier Squadron on 4 July 1942
Redesignated 54th Troop Carrier Squadron, Heavy on 20 July 1948
Inactivated on 5 March 1949

- Activated on 20 September 1949

Discontinued and inactivated on 25 June 1965

- Redesignated 54th Flying Training Squadron on 14 April 1972

Activated on 1 October 1972
Inactivated on 1 April 1997

- Redesignated 54th Air Refueling Squadron on 1 January 1998

Activated on 16 January 1998

=== Assignments ===
- 64th Transport Group, 1 June 1942
- 315th Transport Group (later 315th Troop Carrier Group), 11 June 1942
- Fourth Air Force, 23 October 1942
- XI Air Force Service Command, 15 November 1942 (attached to Troop Carrier Group (Provisional)) 1 July 1943 – 18 February 1944)
- Eleventh Air Force (later Alaskan Air Command), 10 October 1944 – 5 March 1949 (attached to United States Air Forces in Europe (2 – 21 July 1948, Airlift Task Force (Provisional) 29 July – 30 November 1948)
- Alaskan Air Command (attached to 57 Fighter Wing), 20 September 1949 (attached to 57th Fighter Wing)
- 5039th Air Transport Group, 1 January 1951
- Eighteenth Air Force, 23 July 1956 (attached to 63d Troop Carrier Group)
- 63d Troop Carrier Wing, 1 July 1957 (attached to 63d Troop Carrier Group until 7 October 1959)
- 63d Troop Carrier Group, 8 October 1959 (attached to 322d Air Division, February – c.19 August 1959)
- 63d Troop Carrier Wing, 18 January 1963 – 25 June 1965
- 64th Flying Training Wing, 1 October 1972
- 64th Operations Group, 15 December 1991 – 1 April 1997
- 97th Operations Group, 16 January 1998 – present

=== Stations ===
- Hamilton Field, California, 1 June 1942
- Bowman Field, Kentucky, c. 19 June 1942
- Florence Army Air Field, 3 August – 17 October 1942
- Elmendorf Field (later Elmendorf Air Force Base), Alaska, 15 November 1942 – 5 March 1949

Detachment deployed to Rhein-Main Air Base, Germany, 2 July 1948, RAF Fassberg, Germany, 26 September – 30 November 1948

- Elmendorf Air Force Base, Alaska, 20 September 1949
- Donaldson Air Force Base, South Carolina, 23 July 1956 (deployed to Rhein-Main Air Base, Germany February–c. 19 August 1959)
- Hunter Air Force Base, Georgia, 1 April 1963 – 25 June 1965
- Reese Air Force Base, Texas, 1 October 1972 – 1 April 1997
- Altus Air Force Base, Oklahoma, 16 January 1998 – present

=== Aircraft ===
- Lockheed C-60 Lodestar (1942–1944)
- Douglas C-47 Skytrain (1942–1949)
- Douglas C-54 Skymaster (1946–1949, 1949–1952)
- Fairchild C-82 Packet (1949, 1951–1952)
- Douglas C-124 Globemaster II (1952–1965)
- Northrop T-38 Talon (1972–1997)
- Boeing KC-135 Stratotanker (1998 – present)

=== Awards ===
Awards. Air Force Outstanding Unit Awards: 1 July 1957 – 10 December 1962; 1 January 1973 – 31 December 1974; 30 April 1981 – 29 April 1983; 1 April 1984 – 31 March 1986; 1 April 1988 – 31 March 1990; 1 October 1995–[1 April] 1997; [16 January] 1998-30 June 1998; 1 July 1998 – 30 June 1999; 1 July 1999 – 30 June 2000; 1 July 2000 – 30 June 2002; 1 July 2002 – 30 June 2004; 1 July 2004 – 30 June 2006; 1 July 2006 – 30 June 2007; 1 July 2007 – 30 June 2008; 1 July 2008–30 June 2009
