= Altus Air Force Base =

US Air Force base near Altus, Oklahoma, United States

- Altus, Oklahoma in United States of America
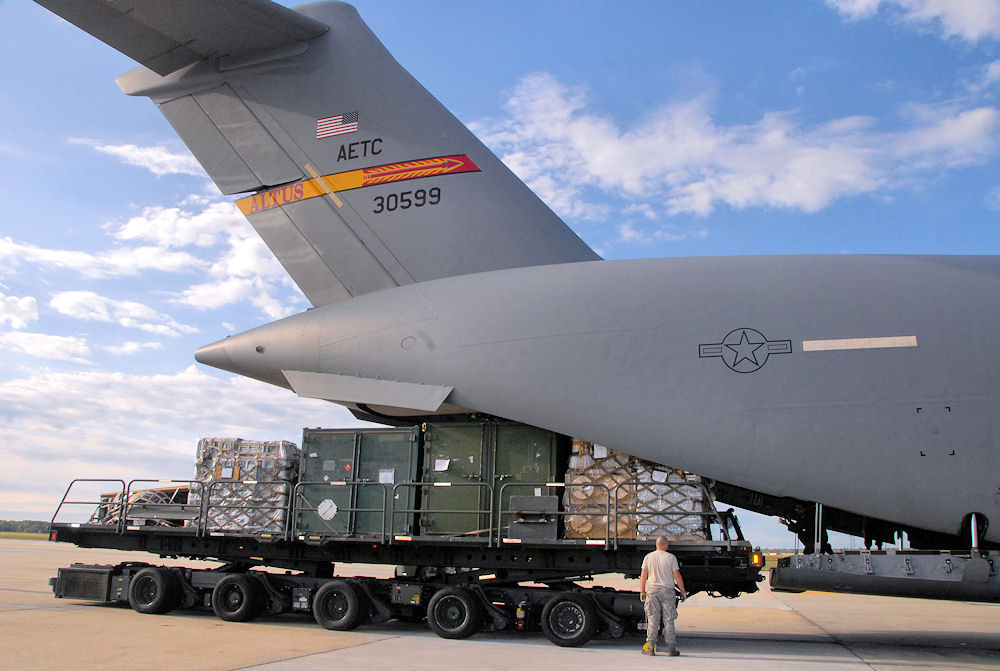
- A Boeing C-17 Globemaster III of the 97th Air Mobility Wing based at Altus AFB.

Site information
- Type: US Air Force base
- Owner: Department of Defense
- Operator: US Air Force
- Controlled by: Air Education and Training Command (AETC)
- Condition: Operational
- Website: www.altus.af.mil/

Location
- Location within North America Location within the United States Location within Oklahoma
- Coordinates: 34°39′59″N 099°16′05″W

Site history
- Built: 1943
- In use: 1943–present

Garrison information
- Current commander: Colonel Richard K. Kind
- Garrison: 97th Air Mobility Wing
- Occupants: 54th Air Refueling Squadron; 56th Air Refueling Squadron; 58th Airlift Squadron; See Based units section for full list.

Airfield information
- Identifiers: IATA: LTS, ICAO: KLTS, FAA LID: LTS, WMO: 0-20000-0-72352
- Elevation: 421 m (1,382 ft) AMSL
Runways
Direction	Length and surface
17R/35L	4,097 m (13,440 ft) Concrete
17L/35R	2,744 m (9,001 ft) Asphalt
Assault Strip	1,067 m (3,500 ft) Asphalt

Altus Air Force Base (Altus AFB, AAFB) (IATA: LTS, ICAO: KLTS, FAA LID: LTS) is a United States Air Force base located approximately 4 miles (6.4 km) east-northeast of Altus, Oklahoma.

The host unit at Altus AFB is the 97th Air Mobility Wing (97 AMW), assigned to the Nineteenth Air Force (19 AF) of the Air Education and Training Command (AETC). The wing's mission is to provide C-17 Globemaster III, KC-135 Stratotanker and KC-46 Pegasus formal initial and advanced specialty training programs for up to 3,000 flight crew and aircraft maintenance students annually.

Altus AFB was established in 1943 as Altus Army Airfield (AAF). The 97 AMW is commanded by Colonel Richard K. Kind with Vice Commander as Colonel Adam H. Rosado, and the Command Chief Master Sergeant is Chief Master Sergeant Jon T. Adams.

== Role and operations ==
The 97 AMW consists of the following major units:

- 97th Operations Group

Plans and executes C-17 and KC-135 formal school, initial and advanced specialty training programs for up to 3000 students annually. Sustains Boeing C-17 Globemaster III, Boeing KC-135 Stratotanker and Boeing KC-46 Pegasus airland, airdrop and air refueling mobility forces, providing global reach for combat and contingency operations. Provides air traffic control and weather forecasting for flying operations.

- 97th Mission Support Group

Provides mission, infrastructure, and community quality of life support for personnel and all assigned organizations on Altus AFB. Supports worldwide USAF taskings with deployment ready personnel and equipment.

- 97th Maintenance Group

Provides maintenance and support to all assigned aircraft and provides the same maintenance support to transient aircraft, engines and associated ground equipment. To provide backshop support to all three aircraft while continuously improving environmental awareness and effectively managing maintenance resources, allowing the 97th Air Mobility Wing to perform its aircrew training mission.

- 97th Medical Group

Ensures maximum wartime readiness and combat capability by promoting the health, safety and morale of active duty personnel. Staffs, trains, mobilizes and provides medical services in support of contingency operations worldwide. Develops and operates a prevention-oriented, cost-effective managed healthcare system for over 9,500 people.

== Based units ==
Flying and notable non-flying units based at Altus Air Force Base.

=== United States Air Force ===
Air Education and Training Command (AETC)

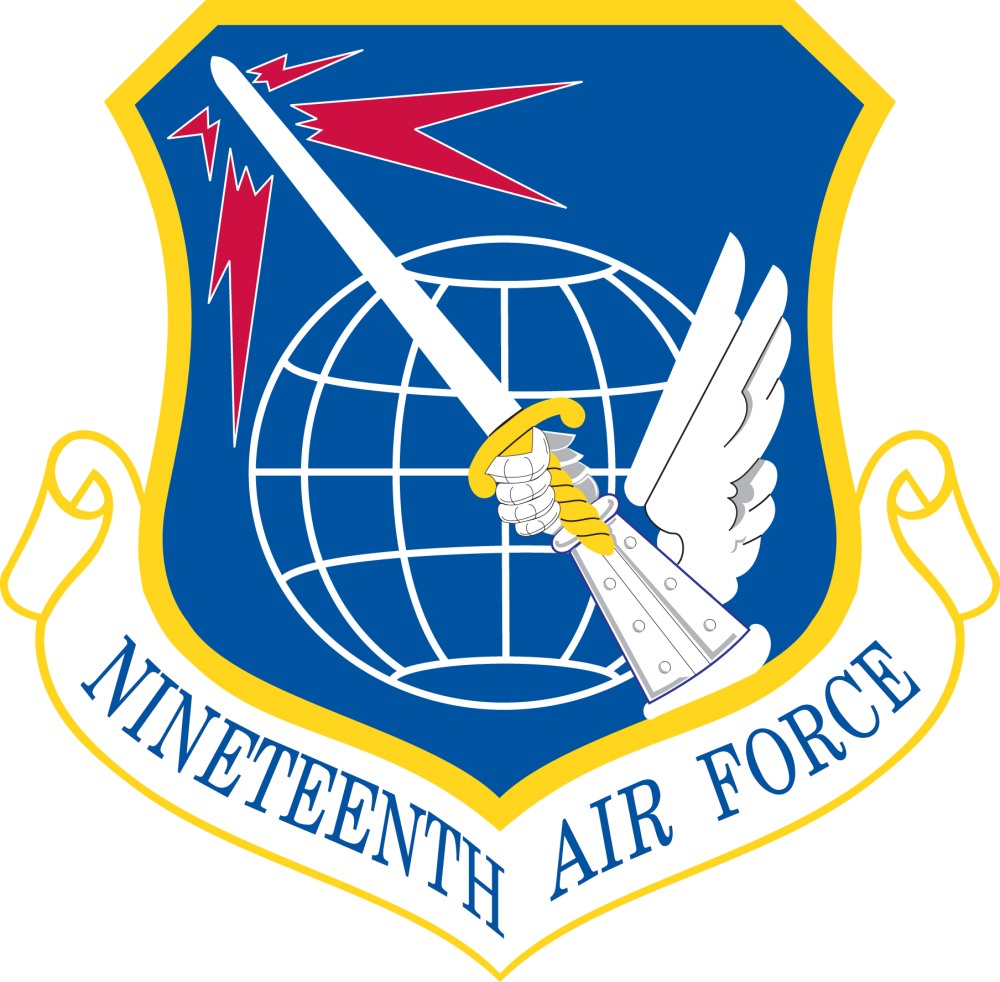
- Nineteenth Air Force
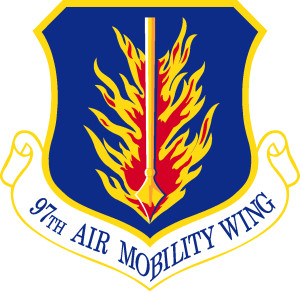
  - 97th Air Mobility Wing
    - Headquarters 97th Air Mobility Wing
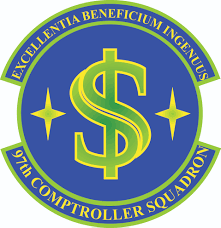
    - 97th Comptroller Squadron
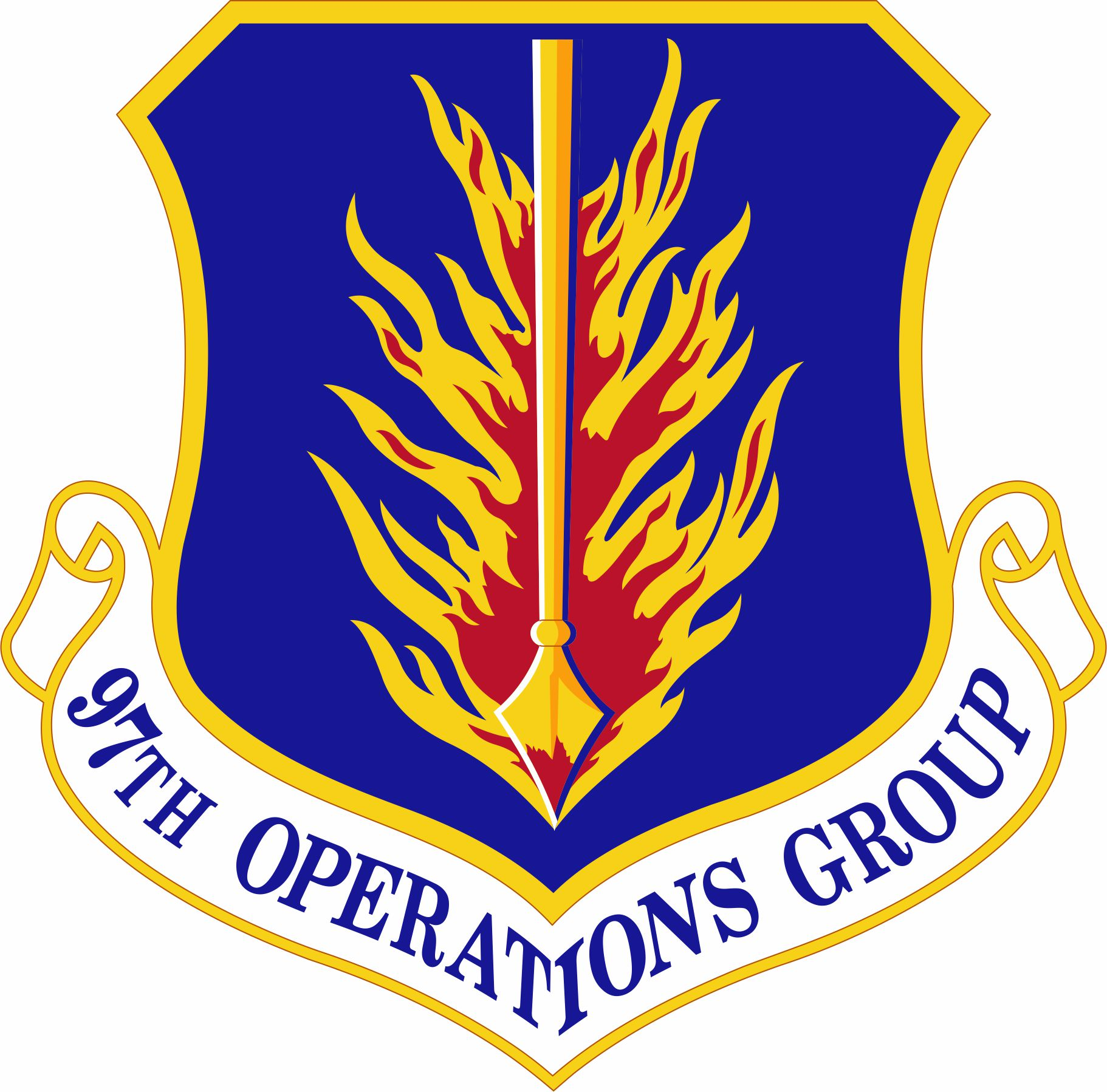
    - 97th Operations Group
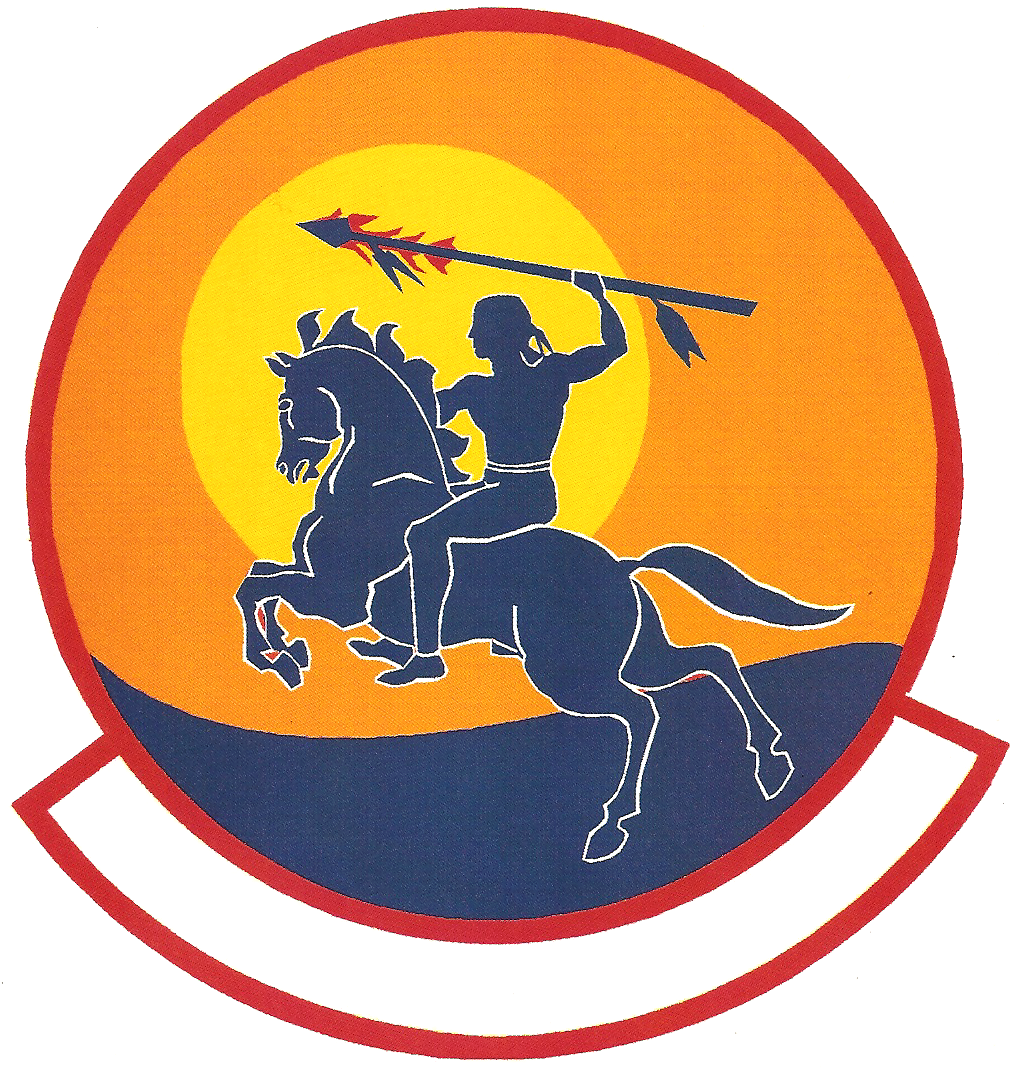
      - 97th Operations Support Squadron
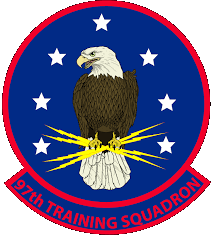
      - 97th Training Squadron
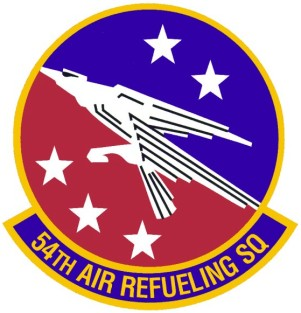
      - 54th Air Refueling Squadron – KC-135R Stratotanker
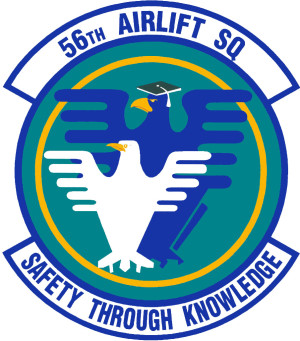
      - 56th Air Refueling Squadron – KC-46A Pegasus
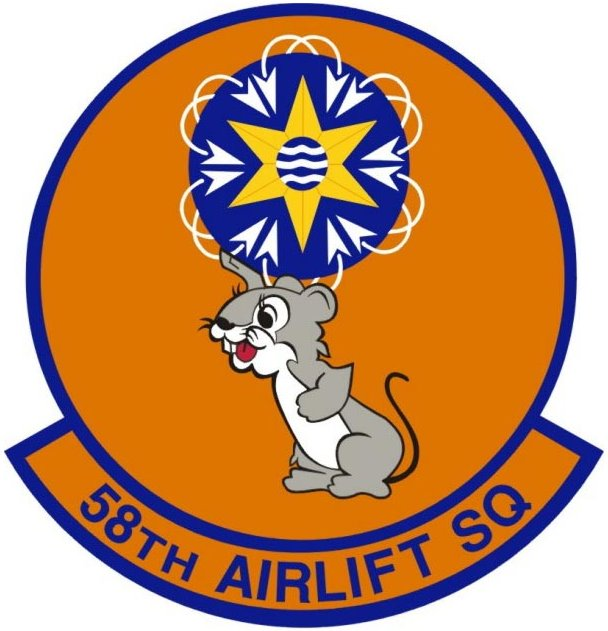
      - 58th Airlift Squadron – C-17A Globemaster III
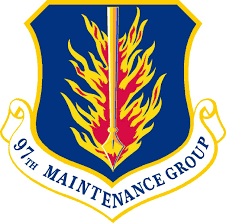
    - 97th Maintenance Group
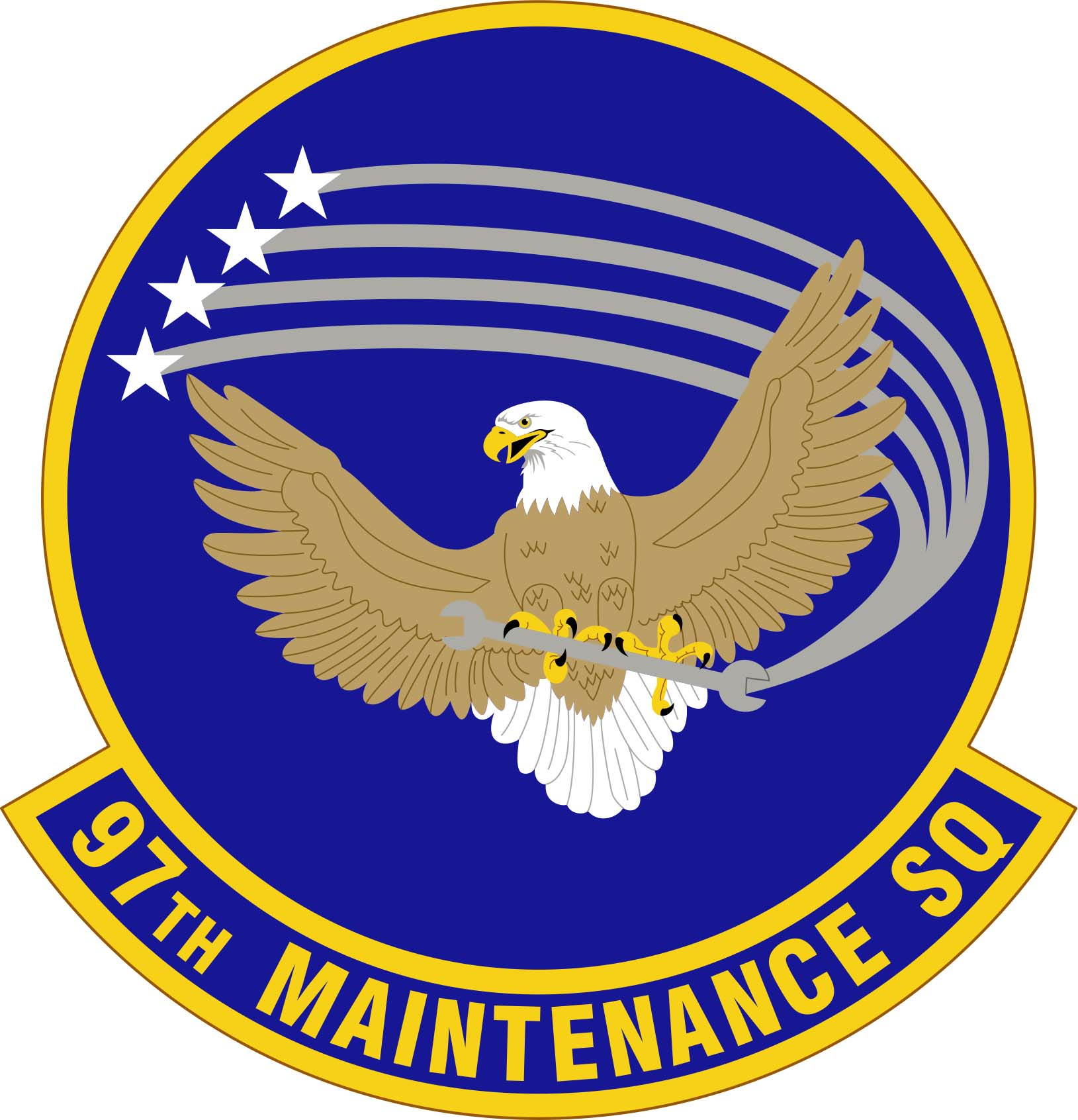
      - 97th Maintenance Squadron
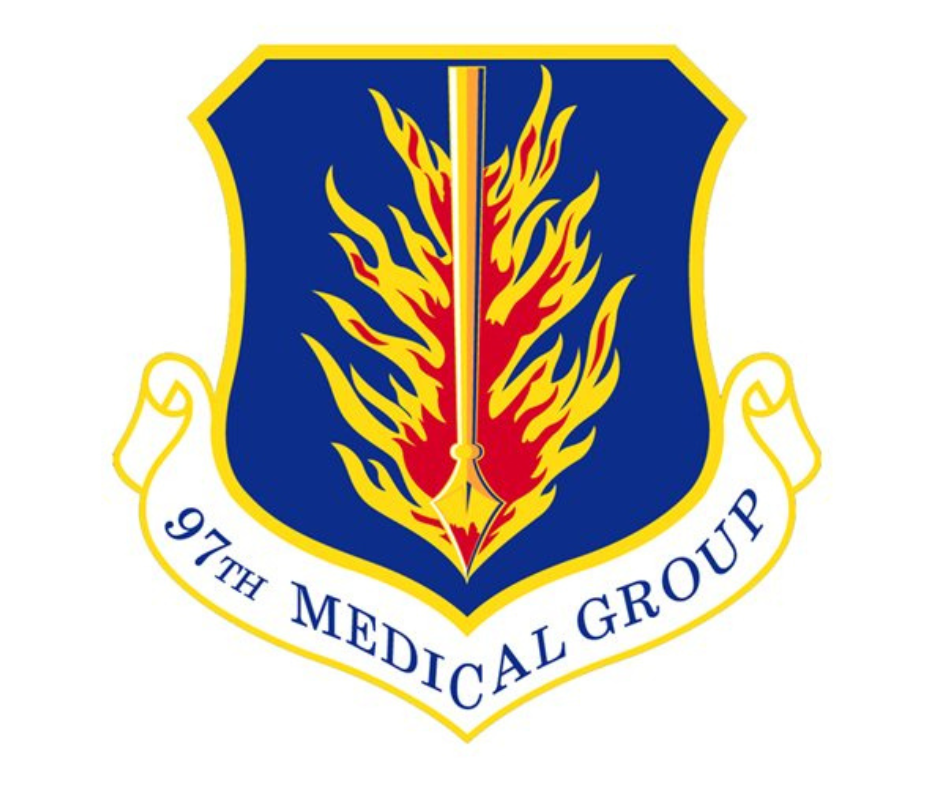
    - 97th Medical Group
      - 97th Operational Medical Readiness Squadron
      - 97th Healthcare Operations Squadron
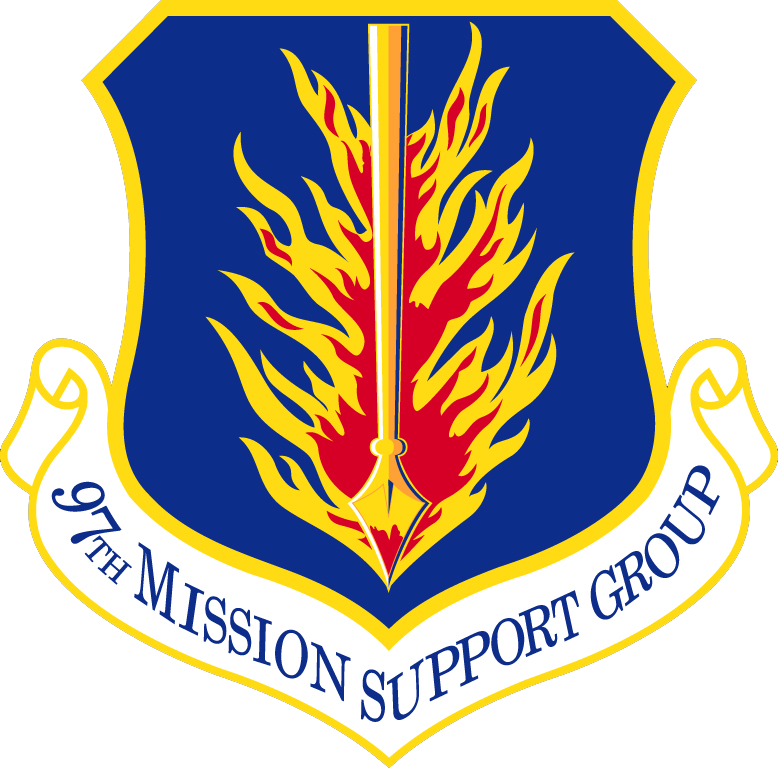
    - 97th Mission Support Group
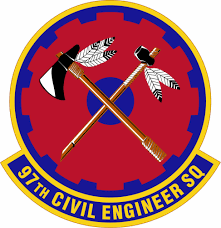
      - 97th Civil Engineer Squadron
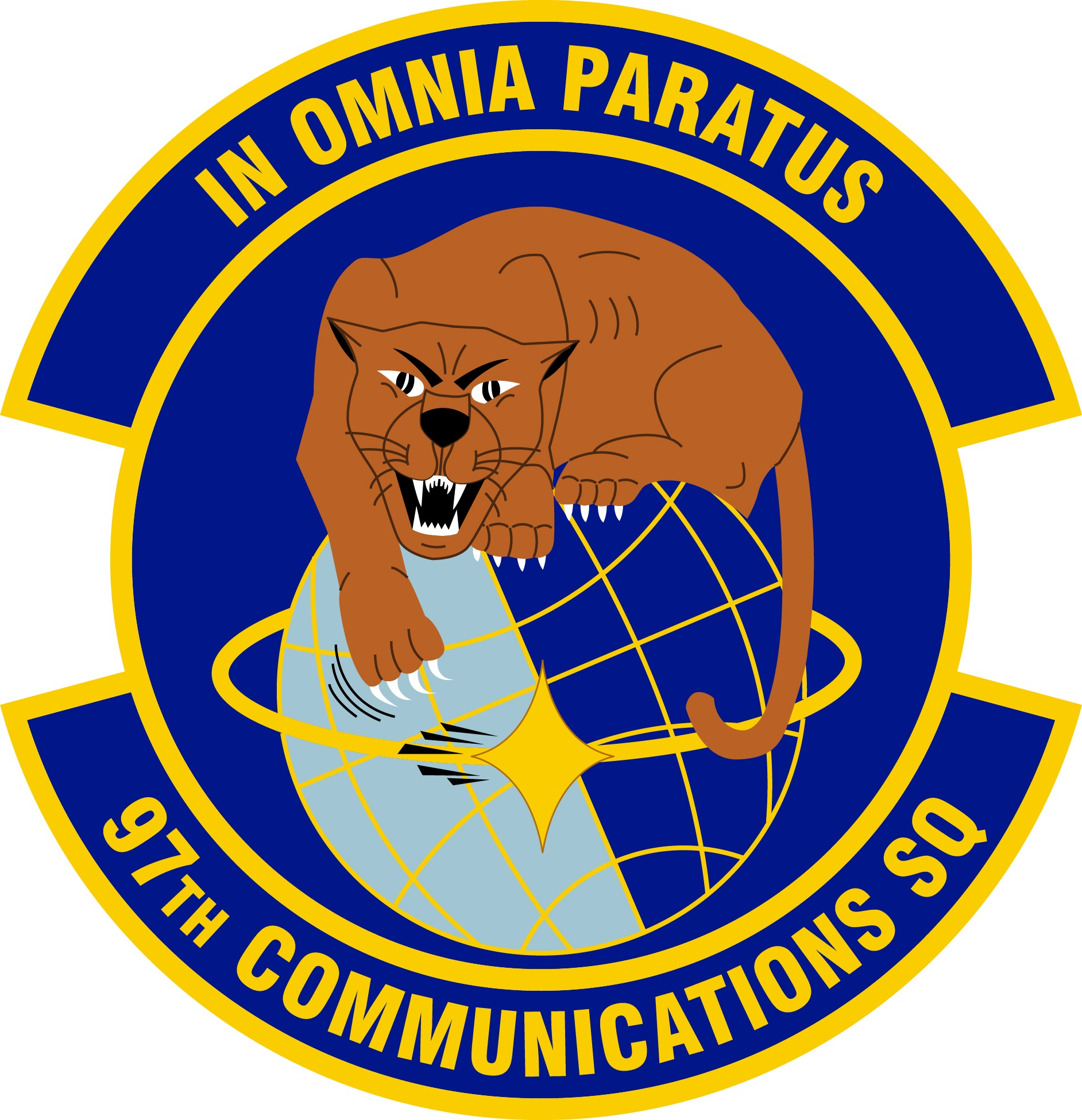
      - 97th Communications Squadron
      - 97th Force Support Squadron
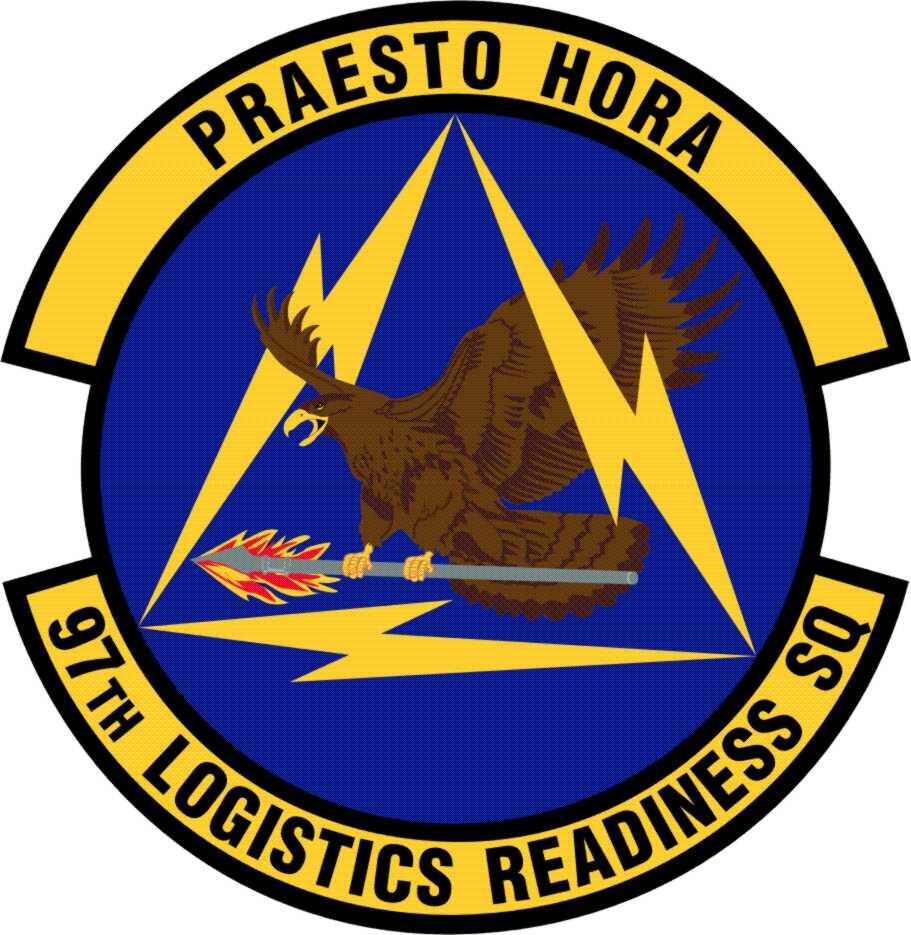
      - 97th Logistics Readiness Squadron
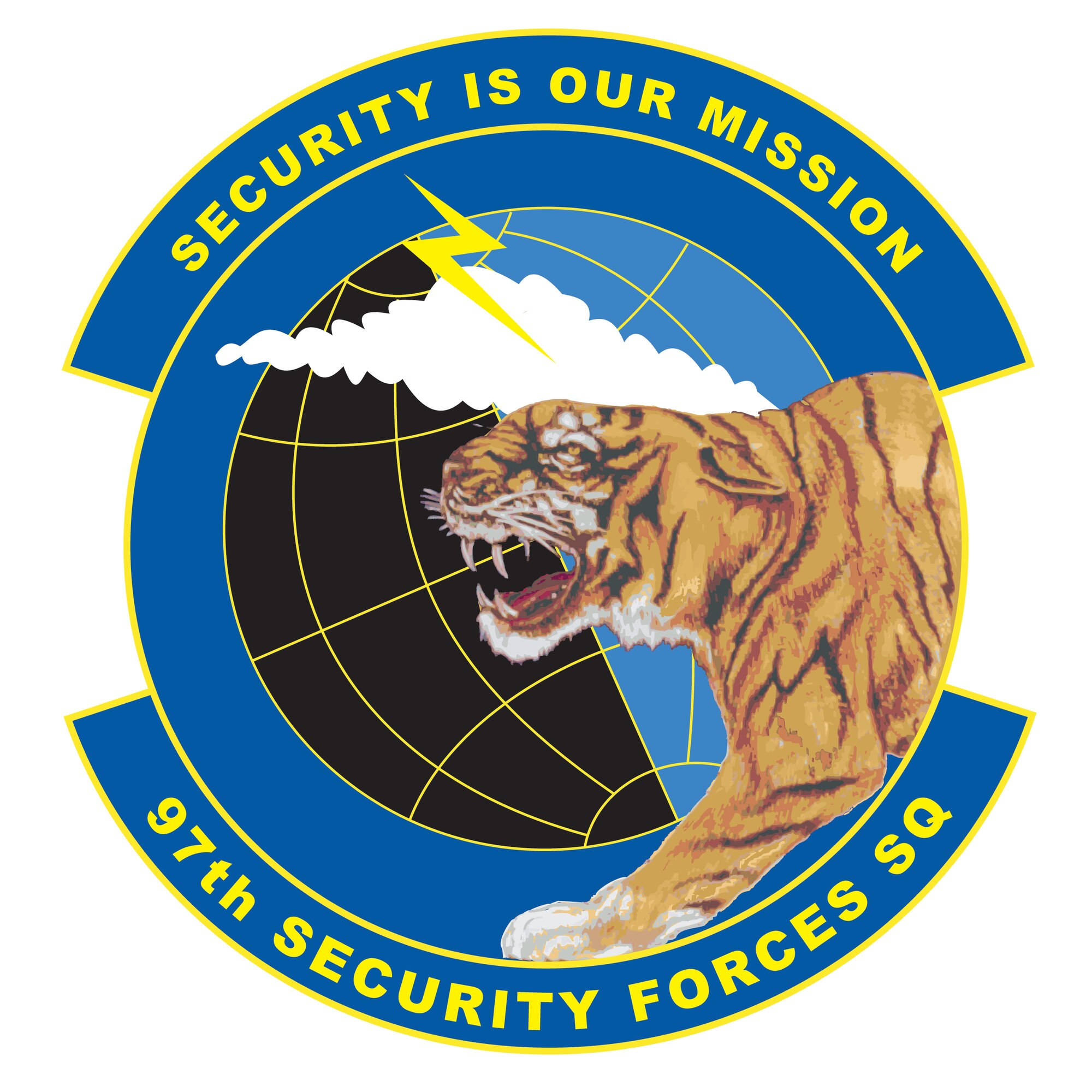
      - 97th Security Forces Squadron

Air Force Reserve Command (AFRC)

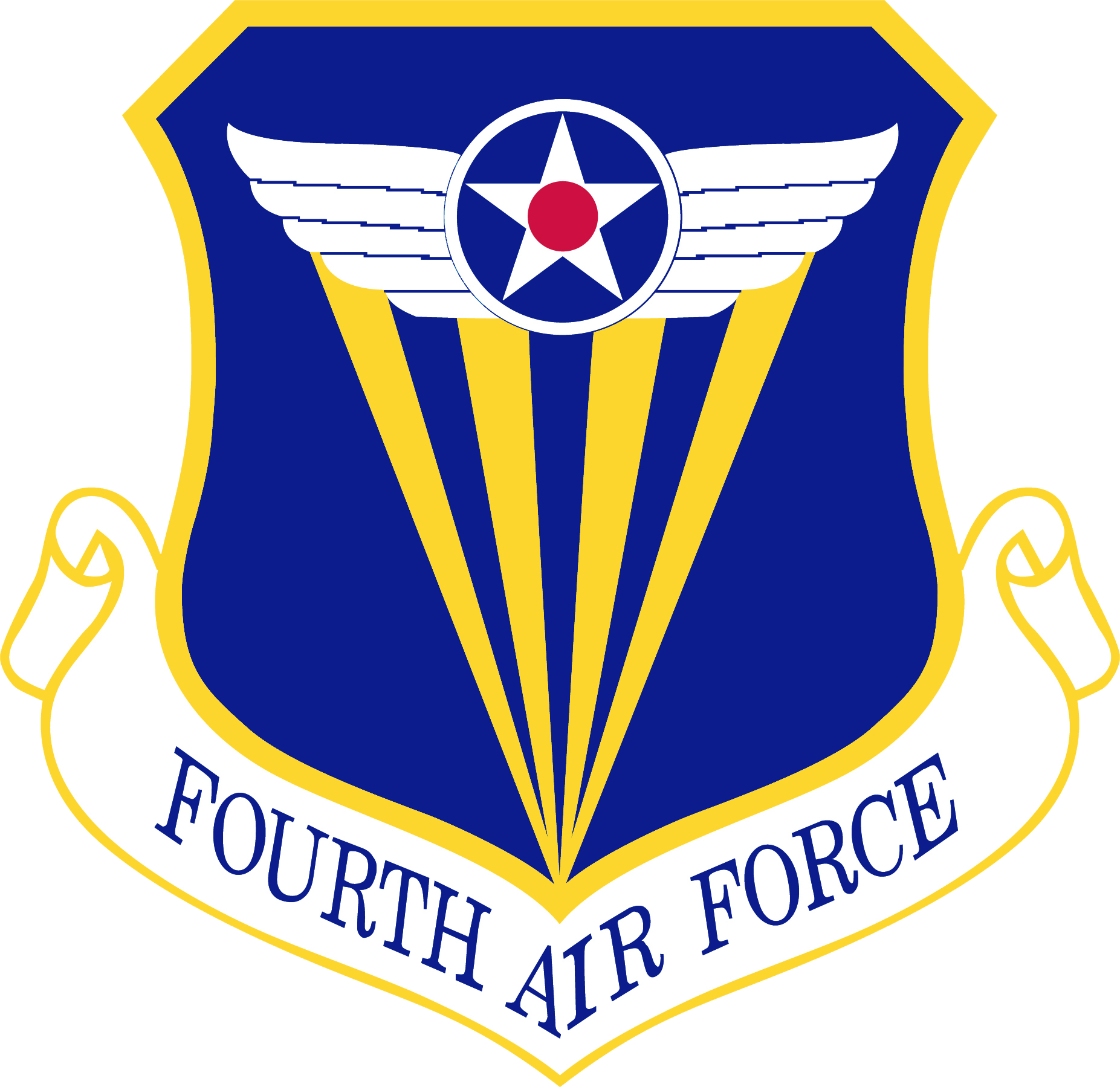
- Fourth Air Force
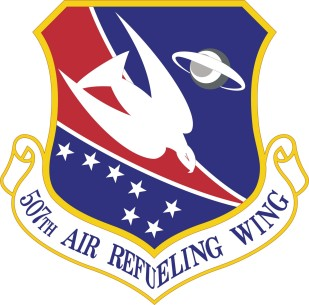
  - 507th Air Refueling Wing
    - 507th Operations Group
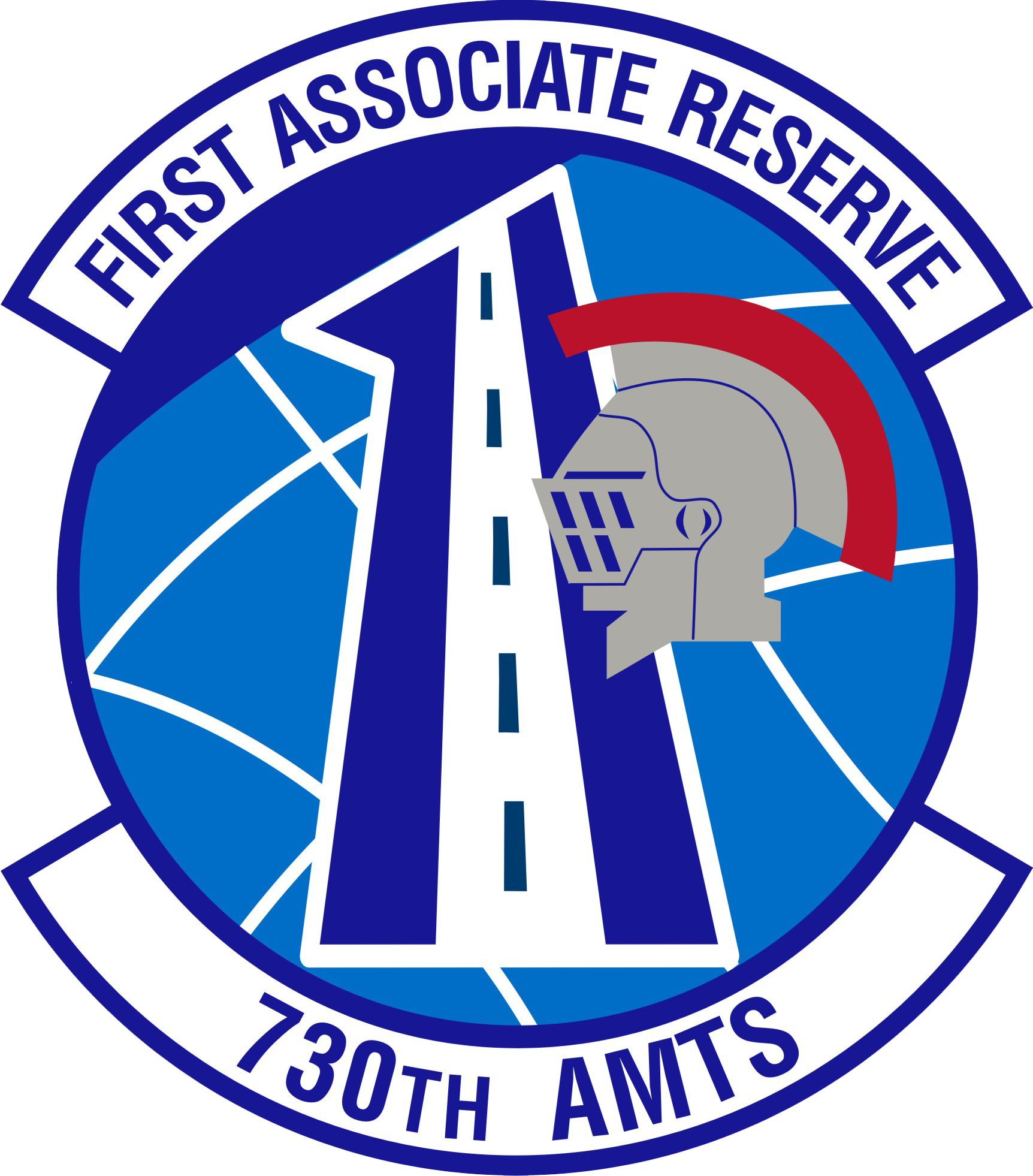
      - 730th Air Mobility Training Squadron (GSU)

== History ==
=== Postwar era ===
The base became operational in January 1943, training new pilots on multi-engine aircraft. The primary training aircraft were the Cessna AT-17 Bobcat and the Curtiss-Wright AT-9 Jeep. On 15 May 1945, the airfield was placed on temporary inactive status.

It later became an aircraft disposal point for the Reconstruction Finance Corporation.

=== Cold War ===
The base sat idle for only a few years. The onset of the Korean War in June 1950 created the need for more staff to fly.

During the 1950s, the base underwent many changes and changed hands from TAC to the Strategic Air Command (SAC). Later that year, on 18 November, the 96th Bombardment Wing, Medium (96 BMW), arrived and began operations with three bomber squadrons and one air refueling squadron. The squadrons eventually flew the first all jet-engined bomber, the B-47 Stratojet and the KC-97 Stratofreighter, a dual-purpose cargo and air-refueling aircraft. By the end of the decade, both of these aircraft would be replaced by aircraft still in the Air Force inventory, the KC-135 Stratotanker and the B-52 Stratofortress. The KC-135 was the first all jet-engined air-refueling aircraft and the B-52 still remains the backbone of the USAF bomber fleet. When the 96th BW moved to Dyess AFB, Texas, the 11th Bombardment Wing (Heavy) activated and stood on alert during the Cold War.

June 1961 witnessed the activation of twelve Atlas “F” intercontinental ballistic missile sites within a 40-mile radius of the base. Controlled by the 577th Strategic Missile Squadron, the missiles sat inside a silo, constructed underground with a launch facility, and staffed around the clock. The missile silos became operational on 10 October 1962, but the activation would be short-lived. The missile at the Frederick, OK, site exploded in May 1964. The missiles were outdated. By April 1965, the missiles were phased out of the national strategic defense plan.

In August 1966, the 4th Mobile Communications Group transferred from Hunter AFB, Georgia, to Altus. The unit's mission consisted of providing mobile and transportable communication services, aiding navigation and air traffic control throughout the world.

In 1967, the Air Force began searching for a base that could handle the training for its strategic airlift fleet, the C-141 Starlifter and its newest and largest transport aircraft, the C-5 Galaxy. Again, Oklahoma proved to be well suited for the mission. The Military Airlift Command (MAC) assumed command of the base from SAC and activated the 443d Military Airlift Wing (443 MAW), Training, to assume host wing responsibilities and to fly alongside the SAC aircraft that would become a tenant command at Altus.

By the start of the 1970s, Altus AFB had three aircraft type/models assigned: KC-135s, C-141s, and C-5s. For the KC-135 aircraft at Altus still under SAC's control, the USAF activated the 340th Air Refueling Wing, which continued to operate the base's KC-135s.

=== The 1990s and beyond ===
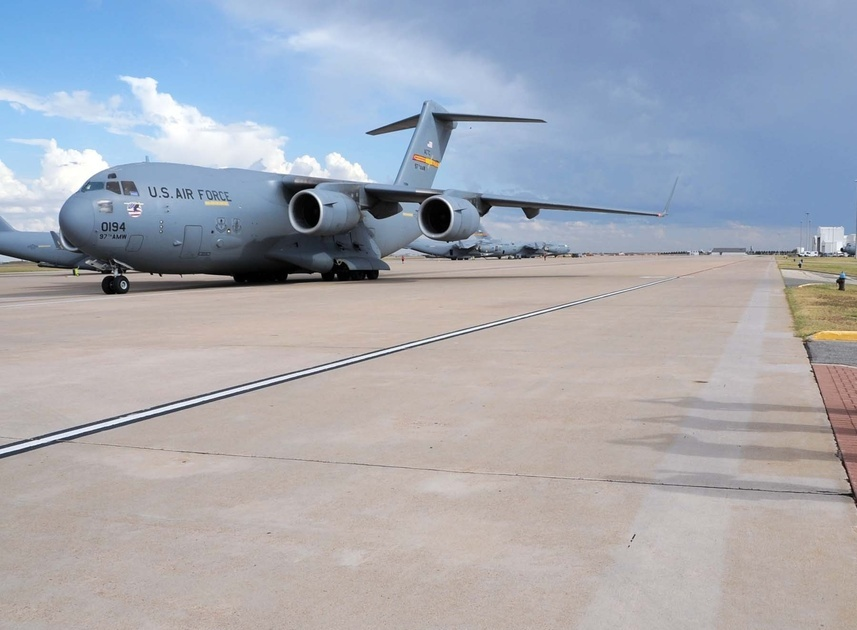
Boeing C-17 Globemaster III of the United States Air Force at the base in 2011

The post Cold War environment brought many changes to Altus AFB. On 1 June 1992, the Air Force reorganized and the Military Airlift Command (MAC) disestablished. In its place the new Air Mobility Command (AMC) was activated, which placed MAC's strategic and tactical airlift aircraft and SAC's aerial refueling aircraft under a single command. Second, the 443d Airlift Wing and the 340th Air Refueling Wing were inactivated, with the latter's aircraft transferred to the 19th Air Refueling Wing at Robins AFB, Georgia.

On 1 October, the first Air Mobility Wing (AMW), the 97th Air Mobility Wing (97 AMW), arrived Altus without personnel or equipment, having formerly been designated as SAC's 97th Bombardment Wing and having been transferred from the deactivating Eaker AFB, Arkansas as a result of Base Realignment and Closure (BRAC) action. The 97 AMW was tasked with flight crew formal training unit (FTU) responsibilities for the C-141 and C-5 aircrew, and with the closure of Castle AFB, California due to BRAC action, concurrently assumed FTU responsibilities for KC-135E/R/T flight crews. On 1 July 1993, the 97th was transferred from AMC to the newly established Air Education and Training Command (AETC) as part of a USAF initiative to move most FTU activities to AETC.

More changes were on the horizon. In 1996, the latest addition to Altus AFB, the new C-17 Globemaster III, arrived. Even before its arrival, the base began training pilots and loadmasters to operate and fly the aircraft.

In August 2002, the mission of the wing grew when the Air Force moved the basic loadmaster course from Sheppard AFB, Texas, to Altus. This initiative combined similar training programs to reduce the number of moves required by trainees while cutting overall costs. Additionally, during that same month, the wing reorganized as a "combat wing": the 97th Support Group became the 97th Mission Support Group, gaining the new 97th Logistics Readiness Squadron (comprising the former 97th Supply Squadron, 97th Transportation Squadron and logistics plans flight) and the 97th Contracting Squadron. Also, the 97th Logistics Group inactivated and the 97th Maintenance Directorate was activated. The directorate comprises civil-service personnel, who are responsible for the care and maintenance of all three airframes at the base.

The 97 AMW discontinued FTU responsibilities for the C-141 concurrent with that aircraft's retirement from the USAF inventory in 2006. On 1 July 2007, the Air Force Reserve Command's (AFRC) 433d Airlift Wing (433 AW) at Lackland AFB/Kelly Field (former Kelly AFB) assumed responsibility for all flying training and academic training for the C-5 aircraft for all Regular Air Force, Air Force Reserve Command (AFRC) and Air National Guard (ANG) aircrews, leaving the 97 AMW and Altus to concentrate on C-17A, KC-135R, and KC-46A training for AMC, USAFE, PACAF, AFRC and ANG aircrews.

=== Previous names ===
- Established on 17 June 1942 as: AAF Advanced Flying School, Altus, Oklahoma
- Altus Army Airfield, 8 April 1943
- AAF Pilot School (Advanced TE), Altus Army Airfield, 6 August 1943 – 23 April 1946
- Inactivated 23 April 1946 – 3 March 1953
- Altus Air Force Base, 3 March 1953 – present

=== Major commands to which assigned ===
- AAF Gulf Coast Training Cen, 26 June 1942
- AAF Central Flying Training Comd, 31 July 1943
- AAF Technical Service Comd, 16 May 1945
- Air Technical Service Comd, 1 July 1945 – 9 March 1946
- Tactical Air Command, 11 June 1952
- Strategic Air Command, 21 June 1954
- Military Airlift Command, 1 July 1968
- Air Mobility Command, 1 October 1992
- Air Education and Training Command, 1 July 1993 – present

=== Base operating units ===
- 453rd Base HQ and Air Base Squadron, 6 October 1942 – 1 May 1944
- 2508th AAF Base Unit (Pilot School), 1 May 1944 – 16 May 1945
- 4124th AAF Base Unit, 16 May – 13 December 1945
- 63rd Air Base Group, 8 January 1953
- 4037th Air Base Group, 15 October 1953 – 18 November 1953
- 96th Air Base Group, 18 November 1953
- 11th Combat Support Gp, 1 March 1959 – 8 July 1968
- 443rd Air Base (later Combat Support) Group, 8 July 1968
- 97th Mission Support Group 1 October 1992 – present

=== Major units assigned ===
- Army Air Force Pilot School (Advanced Training), 26 June 1942 – 15 May 1945
- 4124 Army Air Force Base Unit, 15 May 1945 – 13 December 1945
- 63d Troop Carrier Wing, 8 January 1953 – 14 October 1953
- 96th Bombardment Wing, 18 November 1953 – 7 September 1957
- 11th Bombardment Wing, 13 December 1957 – 25 March 1969
- 340th Air Refueling Wing, 1 July 1977 – 1 October 1992
- 443d Military Airlift Wing, Training, 5 May 1969 – 1 October 1992
- 97th Air Mobility Wing 1 October 1992 – present
- Jackson County Composite Squadron Civil Air Patrol

=== SM-65F Atlas Missile Sites ===
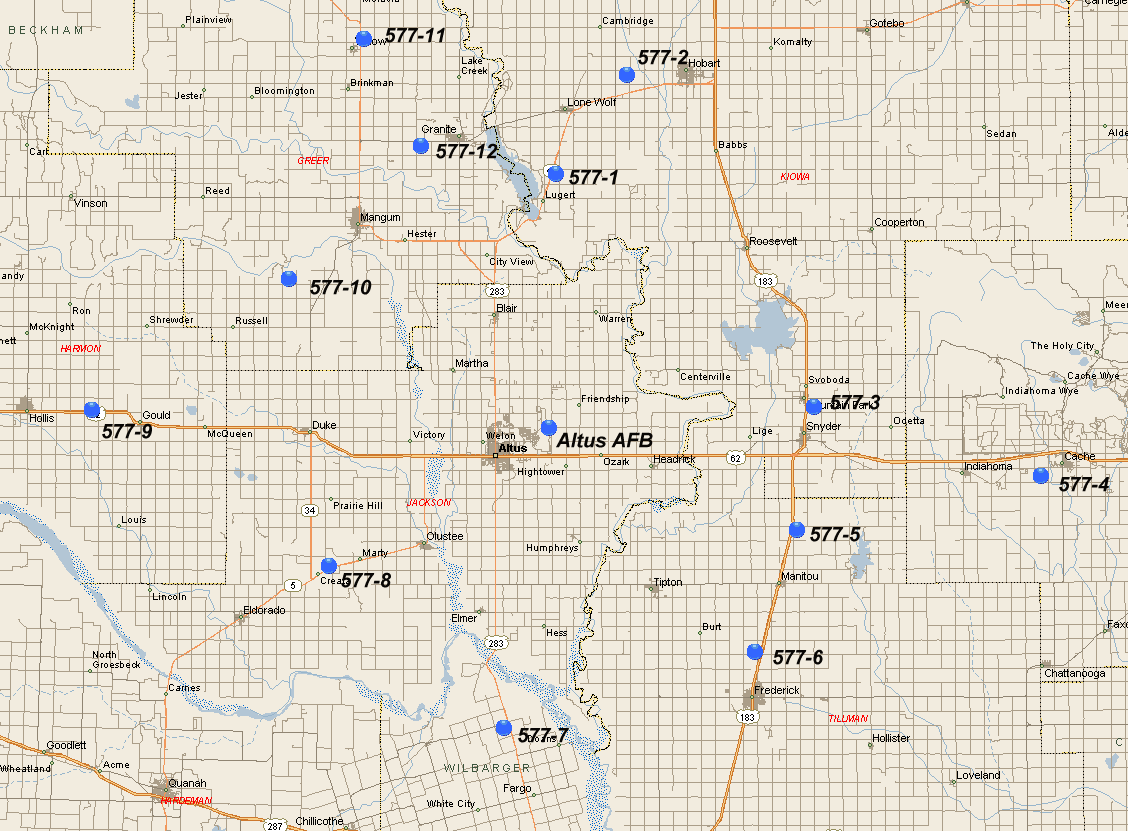
SM-65F Atlas Missile silos

The 577th Strategic Missile Squadron operated twelve missile sites, of one missile at each site:

- 577–1 2.2 mi NNE of Lugert, OK 34°55′32″N 099°15′35″W
- 577–2 3.8 mi SSE of Cambridge, OK 35°01′34″N 099°10′14″W
- 577–3 0.8 mi SE of Mountain Park, OK 34°41′16″N 098°56′27″W
- 577–4 2.1 mi WSW of Cache, OK 34°36′56″N 098°39′39″W
- 577–5 4.0 mi NNE of Manitou, OK 34°33′44″N 098°57′43″W
- 577–6 2.2 mi NNE of Frederick, OK 34°26′18″N 099°00′53″W
- 577–7 4.8 mi SE of Ranchland, TX 34°21′43″N 099°19′27″W
- 577–8 0.6 mi NE of Creta, OK 34°31′36″N 099°32′24″W
- 577–9 3.7 mi NNW of Gould, OK 34°41′05″N 099°50′02″W
- 577–10 6.2 mi SW of Mangum, OK 34°49′04″N 099°35′26″W
- 577–11 1.0 mi NE of Willow, OK 35°03′43″N 099°29′49″W
- 577–12 2.7 mi WSW of Granite, OK 34°57′13″N 099°25′37″W

== See also ==
- List of United States Air Force installations
- Oklahoma World War II Army Airfields

== Other sources ==
- This article incorporates public domain material from the Air Force Historical Research Agency
- This article incorporates public domain material from Altus Air Force Base. United States Air Force.
- Manning, Thomas A. (2005), History of Air Education and Training Command, 1942–2002. Office of History and Research, Headquarters, AETC, Randolph AFB, Texas OCLC 71006954, 29991467
- Maurer, Maurer. Air Force Combat Units of World War II. Washington, DC: U.S. Government Printing Office 1961 (republished 1983, Office of Air Force History, ISBN 0-912799-02-1).
- Mueller, Robert, Air Force Bases Volume I, Active Air Force Bases Within the United States of America on 17 September 1982, Office of Air Force History, 1989
- Ravenstein, Charles A. Air Force Combat Wings Lineage and Honors Histories 1947–1977. Maxwell Air Force Base, Alabama: Office of Air Force History 1984. ISBN 0-912799-12-9.
- Shaw, Frederick J. (2004), Locating Air Force Base Sites, History’s Legacy, Air Force History and Museums Program, United States Air Force, Washington DC. OCLC 57007862, 1050653629
- Altus AFB Website
