= Michael P. Winkler =

U.S. Air Force general

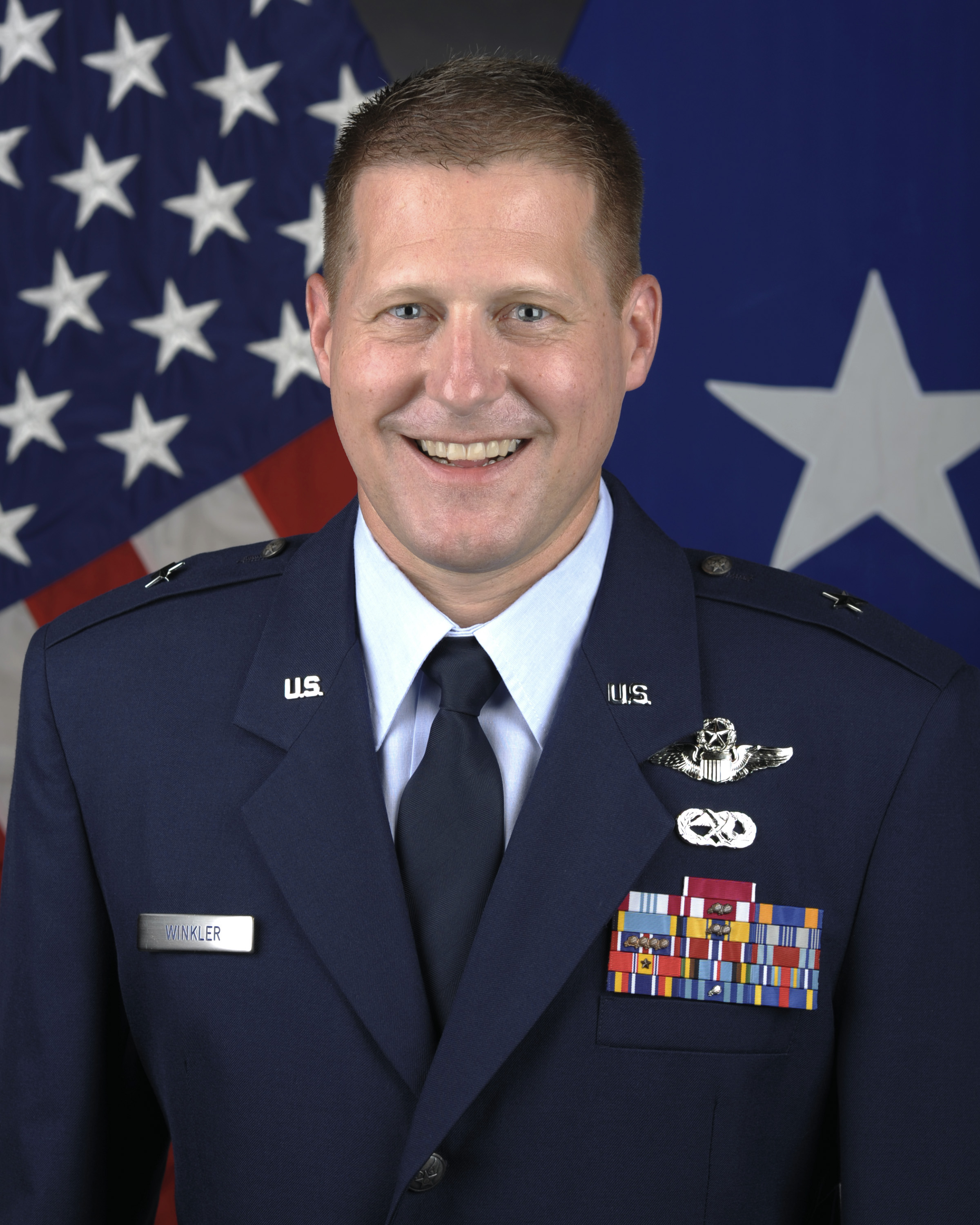
- Official portrait, 2016
- Military career
- Allegiance: United States
- Branch: United States Air Force
- Service years: 1991–2021
- Rank: Brigadier General
- Commands: 354th Fighter Wing; 613th Air Operations Center; 60th Fighter Squadron
- Awards: Legion of Merit (2)

Michael P. Winkler is a retired United States Air Force brigadier general who last served as the Director of Strategic Plans, Requirements and Programs of the Pacific Air Forces. Previously, he was the Vice Commander of the Fifth Air Force. After retiring from the Air Force, he joined the Senior Executive Service and will be assigned as the Deputy Director for Air and Cyberspace Operations of the Pacific Air Forces.

Military offices
Preceded by ???	Commander of the 613th Air Operations Center; 2012–2014	Succeeded by David Moeller
Preceded by James N. Post III	Commander of the 354th Fighter Wing; 2014–2016	Succeeded by David Mineau
Preceded by David A. Krumm	Vice Commander of the Fifth Air Force; 2016–2018	Succeeded by Todd A. Dozier
Preceded by Craig D. Wills	Director of Strategic Plans, Requirements and Programs of the Pacific Air Forces; 2018–2021	Succeeded by Christopher J. Niemi
