= Scott Kindsvater =

U.S. Air Force Lieutenant general

Scott A. Kindsvater
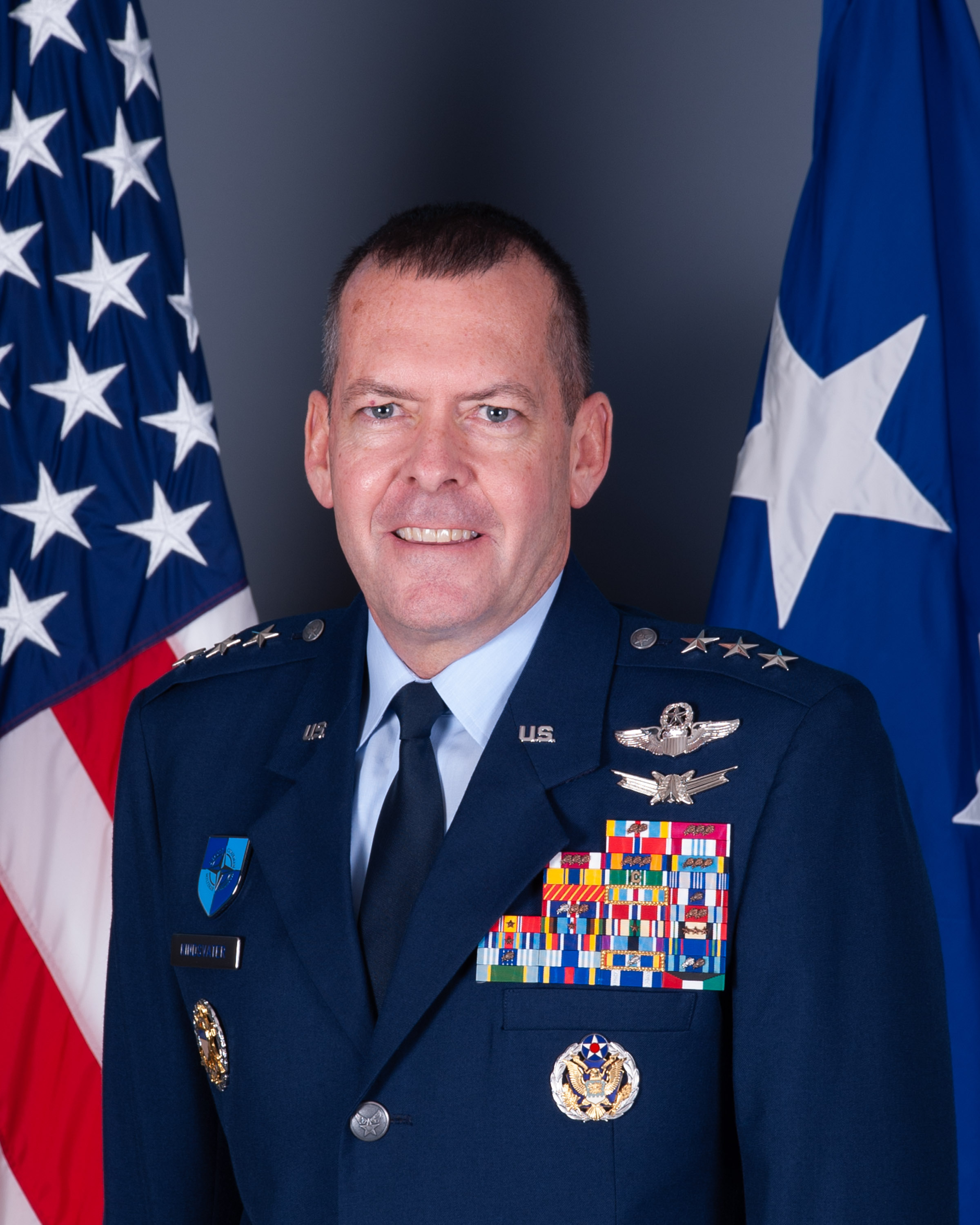
- Military career
- Allegiance: United States
- Branch: United States Air Force
- Service years: 1989–2021
- Rank: Lieutenant General
- Commands: Deputy Chair of the NATO Military Committee; 82nd Training Wing; 93rd Air Ground Operations Wing; USAF Weapons School
- Conflicts: Gulf War; Iraq War
- Awards: Defense Superior Service Medal (4); Legion of Merit (4); Bronze Star Medal

Scott Andrew Kindsvater is a retired United States Air Force lieutenant general who last served as the 22nd Deputy Chair of the NATO Military Committee. He assists the Chair's role as principal adviser to the NATO Secretary General and senior military spokesman of the 30-nation alliance. He also advises the Deputy Secretary General, leads coordination of nuclear, biological and chemical matters and, in the Chair's absence, directs daily operations and the business of the Military Committee, NATO's highest military authority. Previously, he was the deputy chief of staff for operations and intelligence of the Supreme Headquarters Allied Powers Europe.

He is retired from active duty as of October 1, 2021.

== Awards and decorations ==
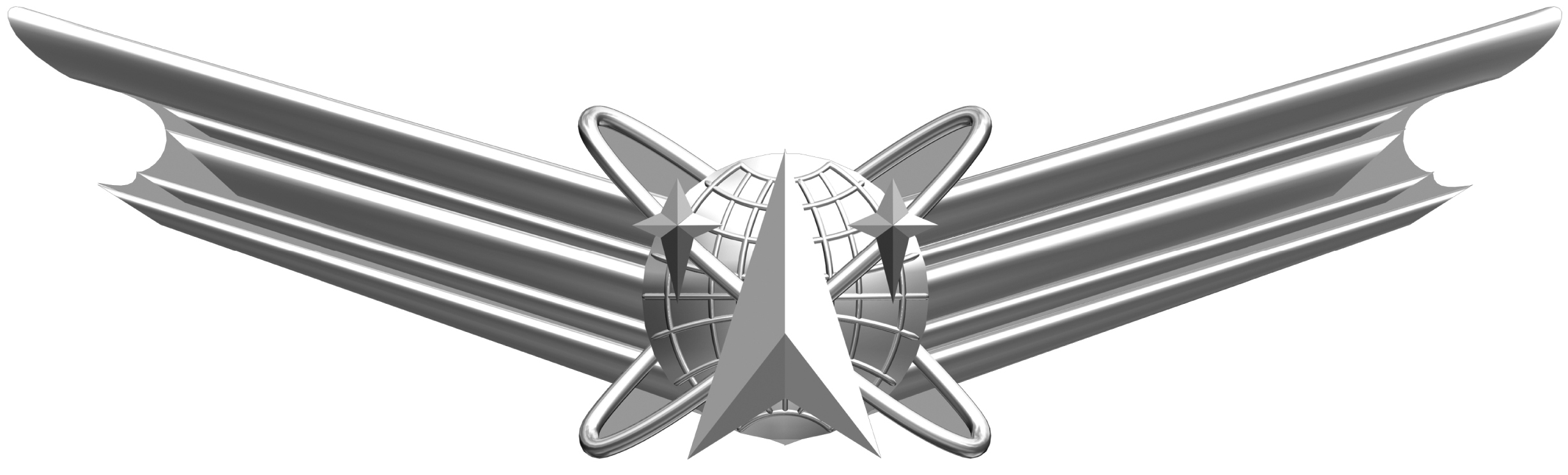
| U.S. Air Force Command Pilot Badge |
| Basic Space Operations Badge |
| Headquarters Air Force Badge |
| Office of the Joint Chiefs of Staff Identification Badge |
| Deputy Chairman of the NATO Military Committee |

| Defense Superior Service Medal with three bronze oak leaf clusters |
| Legion of Merit with three oak leaf clusters |
| Bronze Star Medal |
| Defense Meritorious Service Medal |
| Meritorious Service Medal with three oak leaf clusters |
| Air Medal with three oak leaf clusters |
| Aerial Achievement Medal with three oak leaf clusters |
| Air Force Commendation Medal |
| Army Commendation Medal with "C" device |
| Air Force Achievement Medal |
| Air Force Combat Action Medal |
| Joint Meritorious Unit Award |
| Air Force Meritorious Unit Award with oak leaf cluster |
| Air Force Outstanding Unit Award with silver and two bronze oak leaf clusters |
| Air Force Organizational Excellence Award |
| Combat Readiness Medal with two oak leaf clusters |
| National Defense Service Medal with one bronze service star |
| Armed Forces Expeditionary Medal with service star |
| Southwest Asia Service Medal with service star |
| Iraq Campaign Medal with three service stars |
| Global War on Terrorism Expeditionary Medal with service star |
| Global War on Terrorism Service Medal |
| Humanitarian Service Medal |
| Nuclear Deterrence Operations Service Medal |
| Air Force Overseas Short Tour Service Ribbon with oak leaf cluster |
| Air Force Overseas Long Tour Service Ribbon |
| Air Force Expeditionary Service Ribbon with gold frame and silver oak leaf cluster |
| Air Force Longevity Service Award with one silver and two bronze oak leaf clusters |
| Small Arms Expert Marksmanship Ribbon |
| Air Force Training Ribbon |
| NATO Medal for service with ISAF |
| Kuwait Liberation Medal (Kuwait) |

== Effective dates of promotions ==
| Rank | Date |
|---|---|
| Second Lieutenant | May 31, 1989 |
| First Lieutenant | May 31, 1991 |
| Captain | May 31, 1993 |
| Major | July 1, 1999 |
| Lieutenant Colonel | March 1, 2003 |
| Colonel | January 1, 2007 |
| Brigadier General | November 9, 2012 |
| Major General | August 12, 2016 |
| Lieutenant General | September 27, 2019 |

== Notes ==
1.The official biography claims an impossible date "June 31, 1991." May 31 follows with Air Force tradition to promote second & first lieutenants exactly every two years.

Military offices
| Preceded by John P. Horner | Commander of the 93rd Air Ground Operations Wing; 2011–2012 | Succeeded by Samuel P. Milam |
| Preceded by Michael Fantini | Commander of the 82nd Training Wing; 2013–2015 | Succeeded by Patrick J. Doherty |
| Preceded by ??? | Assistant Deputy Commander of the United States Air Force Central Command; 2015–2016 | Succeeded by Matthew Isler |
| Preceded by Peter Gersten | Deputy Commander for Operations and Intelligence of the Combined Joint Task Force; 2016–2017 | Succeeded by Dirk D. Smith |
| Preceded by Joseph T. Guastella | Deputy Chief of Staff for Operations and Intelligence of the Supreme Headquarters Allied Powers Europe; 2017–2019 | Succeeded by Phillip Stewart |
| Preceded by Steven M. Shepro | Deputy Chair of the NATO Military Committee; 2019–2021 | Succeeded by Lance K. Landrum |
