= Joseph T. Guastella =

United States Air Force general (born 1965)

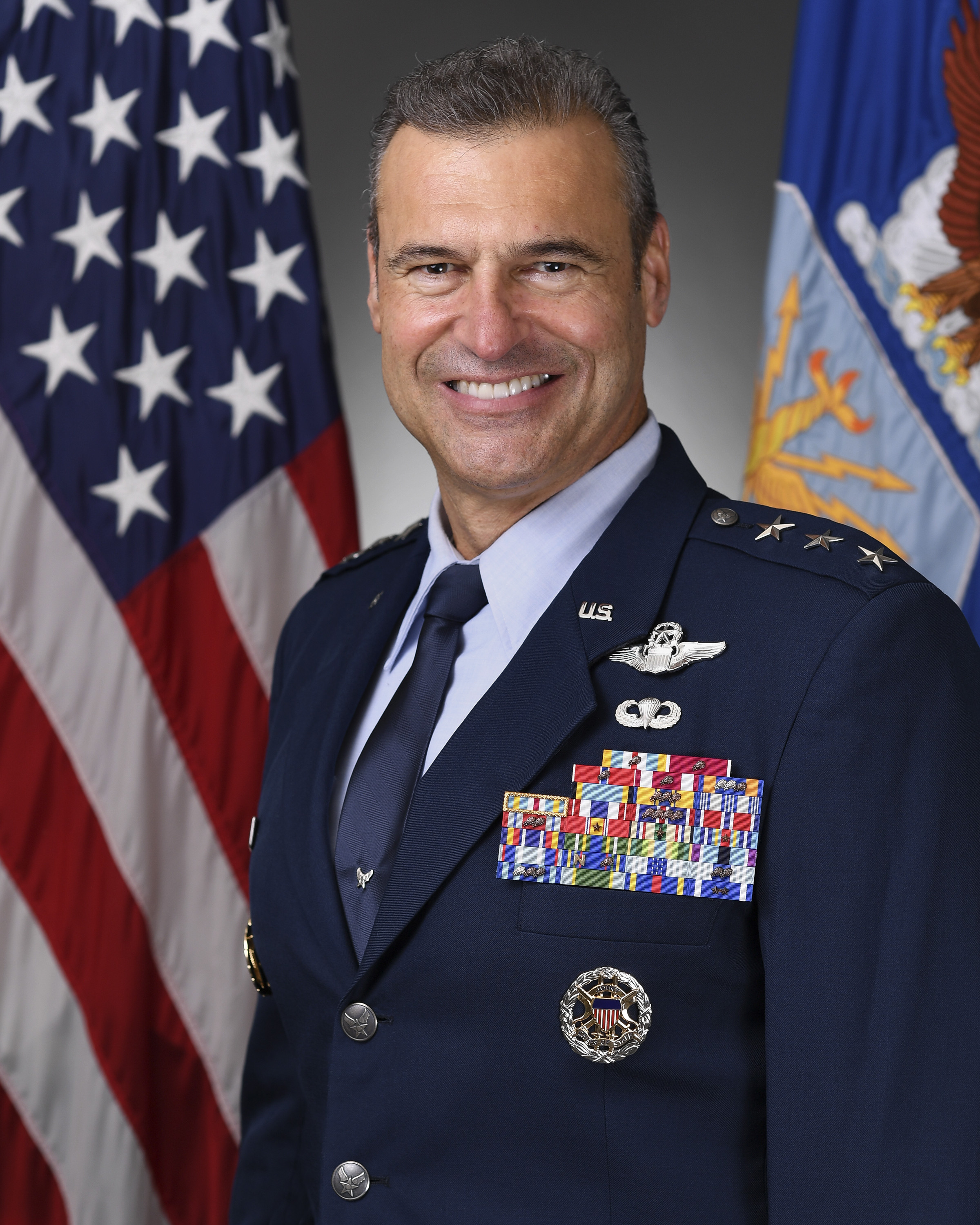
- Born: 1965 (age 60–61)
- Military career
- Allegiance: United States
- Branch: United States Air Force
- Service years: 1987–2022
- Rank: Lieutenant General
- Commands: United States Air Forces Central Command; 455th Air Expeditionary Wing; 20th Fighter Wing; 555th Fighter Squadron
- Conflicts: War in Afghanistan
- Awards: Defense Superior Service Medal (2); Legion of Merit (2); Bronze Star Medal (2)

Joseph Thomas Guastella Jr. (born 1965) is a retired lieutenant general in the United States Air Force who served as the Deputy Chief of Staff for Operations of the United States Air Force. He was commissioned upon his graduation from the United States Air Force Academy in 1987.

== Air Force career ==
Joseph Thomas Guastella Jr. entered the United States Air Force in 1987 as a graduate of the United States Air Force Academy. He is a command pilot with more than 4,000 flight hours in the F-16 Fighting Falcon and A-10 Thunderbolt II. He has served multiple combat tours and flown combat missions in support of Operations Just Cause and Desert Storm. He further instructed at the United States Air Force Fighter Weapons School. Guastella has commanded the 555th Fighter Squadron, "Triple Nickel", Aviano Air Base, Italy, the 20th Fighter Wing at Shaw Air Force Base, South Carolina, and the 455th Air Expeditionary Wing, Bagram Airfield, Afghanistan.

As a general officer, Guastella served at the Pentagon as the deputy director of Programs, Office of the Deputy Chief of Staff for Strategic Plans and Programs. Following his reassignment, he was selected as commander of the 455th Air Expeditionary Wing. He served as the deputy director of Requirements, Joint Staff and was subsequently assigned as Deputy Chief of Staff, Operations and Intelligence, NATO. Most recently he served as the Director of Integrated Air, Space, Cyberspace and Intelligence, Surveillance and Reconnaissance Operations at Headquarters Air Force Space Command, Peterson AFB, Colorado.

Guastella is a graduate of the Air Command and Staff College, National War College and the Senior Executive Fellows program.

In May 2022, the Air Force announced Guastella's retirement from active duty.

== Education ==
1987 Bachelor of Science in Astronautical Engineering, U.S. Air Force Academy, Colorado Springs, Colo.
1994 Squadron Officer School, Maxwell AFB, Ala.
1997 Master of Science in Aero Science Technology, Embry Riddle University, Daytona Beach, Fla.
2001 Air Command and Staff College, Maxwell AFB, Ala.
2006 Master of Science in National Security Strategy, National War College, Fort McNair, Washington, D.C.
2011 Senior Executive Fellows program, John F. Kennedy School of Government, Harvard University, Cambridge, Mass.

== Assignments ==
- August 1987 – January 1989, student pilot, 80th Flying Training Wing, Sheppard AFB, Texas
- January 1989 – September 1989, F-16 initial training, Luke AFB, Ariz.
- September 1989 – May 1992, squadron electronic combat pilot and assistant weapons officer, 526th Tactical Fighter Squadron, Ramstein AB, Germany
- May 1992 – May 1993, instructor pilot, assistant flight commander and assistant weapons officer, 35th Fighter Squadron, Kunsan AB, South Korea
- May 1993 – April 1994, standardization and evaluation flight examiner, 526th TFS, Ramstein AB, Germany
- April 1994 – January 1995, standardization and evaluation flight examiner, 555th FS, Aviano AB, Italy
- Jan 1995 – June 1995, student, fighter Weapons School, Nellis AFB, Nev.
- June 1995 – December 1996, squadron weapons and tactics officer and assistant wing weapons officer, 555th FS, Aviano AB, Italy
- December 1996 – August 2000, Instructor, F-16 Fighter Weapons Instructor Course, Nellis AFB, Nev.
- September 2000 – June 2001, student, Air Command and Staff College, Maxwell AFB, Ala.
- June 2001 – August 2002, action officer, Joint Strike Fighter and Combat Identification Programs, Headquarters Air Force, Directorate of Operational Requirements, Washington, D.C.
- August 2002 – October 2003, operations officer, 555th FS, Aviano AB, Italy
- October 2003 – July 2005, commander, 555th Fighter Squadron, Aviano AB, Italy
- August 2005 – July 2006, student, National War College, Fort Lesley J. McNair, Washington, D.C.
- June 2006 – June 2007, U.S. CENTAF, (A3) forward and CAOC Director of Operations, Southwest Asia
- June 2007 – August 2008, Deputy Director CAPSTONE, National Defense University, Fort Lesley J. McNair, Washington, D.C.
- August 2008 – October 2008, vice commander, 20th Fighter Wing, Shaw AFB, S.C.
- October 2008 – June 2010, commander, 20th Fighter Wing, Shaw AFB, S.C.
- June 2010 – July 2011, Chief Program Integration Division, Directorate of Programs, DCS Strategic Plans and Programs, the Pentagon Washington, D.C.
- July 2011 – June 2012, deputy director of Programs, Office of the Deputy Chief of Staff for Strategic Plans and Programs, Headquarters U.S. Air Force, Washington, D.C.
- July 2012 – July 2013, commander, 455th Air Expeditionary Wing, Bagram Airfield, Afghanistan
- July 2013 – July 2015, deputy director of Requirements (J8), Joint Staff, Washington, D.C.
- July 2015 – July 2017, Deputy Chief of Staff, Operations and Intelligence, SHAPE, Casteau Belgium
- July 2017 – August 2018, Director of Integrated Air, Space, Cyberspace and Intelligence, Surveillance and Reconnaissance Operations, Headquarters Air Force Space Command, Peterson AFB, Colo.
- August 2018 – July 2020, Commander, U.S. Air Forces Central Command, Combined Forces Air Component Commander, U.S. Central Command, Southwest Asia
- August 2020 – July 2022, Deputy Chief of Staff, Operations, Headquarters Air Force, the Pentagon, Arlington, Va.

== Flight information ==
Rating: command pilot
Flight hours: more than 4,000, including more than 1,000 combat
Aircraft flown: F-16C/D, A-10C

== Awards and decorations ==
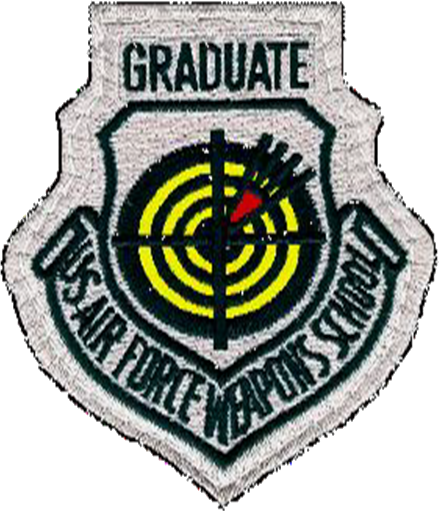
US Air Force Command Pilot Badge
Basic Parachutist Badge
Office of the Joint Chiefs of Staff Identification Badge
Headquarters Air Force Badge
Air Force Weapons Instructor School Graduate Patch

Defense Superior Service Medal with one bronze oak leaf cluster
Legion of Merit with oak leaf cluster
Bronze Star Medal with oak leaf cluster
Meritorious Service Medal with oak leaf cluster
Air Medal with eleven oak leaf clusters
Aerial Achievement Medal
Air Force Commendation Medal with three oak leaf clusters
Air Force Achievement Medal
Joint Meritorious Unit Award
Air Force Meritorious Unit Award
Air Force Outstanding Unit Award with four oak leaf clusters
Air Force Organizational Excellence Award
Combat Readiness Medal with two oak leaf clusters
National Defense Service Medal with one bronze service star
Southwest Asia Service Medal with service star
Global War on Terrorism Expeditionary Medal with service star
Global War on Terrorism Service Medal
Korea Defense Service Medal
Armed Forces Service Medal
Humanitarian Service Medal
Air and Space Campaign Medal
Nuclear Deterrence Operations Service Medal with "N" Device and oak leaf cluster
Air Force Overseas Short Tour Service Ribbon
Air Force Overseas Long Tour Service Ribbon with two oak leaf clusters
Air Force Longevity Service Award with one silver and two bronze oak leaf clusters
Small Arms Expert Marksmanship Ribbon
Air Force Training Ribbon
NATO Medal for Former Yugoslavia with two service stars

== Effective dates of promotions ==
Rank	Date
Second Lieutenant	27 May 1987
First Lieutenant	27 May 1989
Captain	27 May 1991
Major	1 November 1998
Lieutenant Colonel	1 February 2003
Colonel	15 June 2006
Brigadier General	18 November 2011
Major General	24 July 2015
Lieutenant General	30 August 2018

Military offices
Preceded by James N. Post III	Commander of the 20th Fighter Wing; 2008–2010	Succeeded by Charles L. Moore
Preceded by Thomas H. Deale	Commander of the 455th Air Expeditionary Wing; 2012–2013	Succeeded by Patrick E. Malackowski
Preceded by ???	Deputy Director of Requirements of the Joint Staff; 2013–2015	Succeeded by Steven L. Basham
Preceded by ???	Deputy Chief of Staff for Operations and Intelligence of the Supreme Headquarters Allied Powers Europe; 2015–2017	Succeeded by Scott Kindsvater
Preceded by Stephen Whiting	Director of Integrated Air, Space, Cyberspace and ISR Operations of the Air Force Space Command; 2017–2018	Succeeded by DeAnna Burt
Preceded by Jeffrey L. Harrigian	Commander of the United States Air Forces Central Command; 2018–2020	Succeeded by Gregory M. Guillot
Preceded by Mark D. Kelly	Deputy Chief of Staff for Operations of the United States Air Force; 2020–2022	Succeeded by Charles S. Corcoran; Acting
