= Jerry D. Harris =

Retired U.S. Air Force general

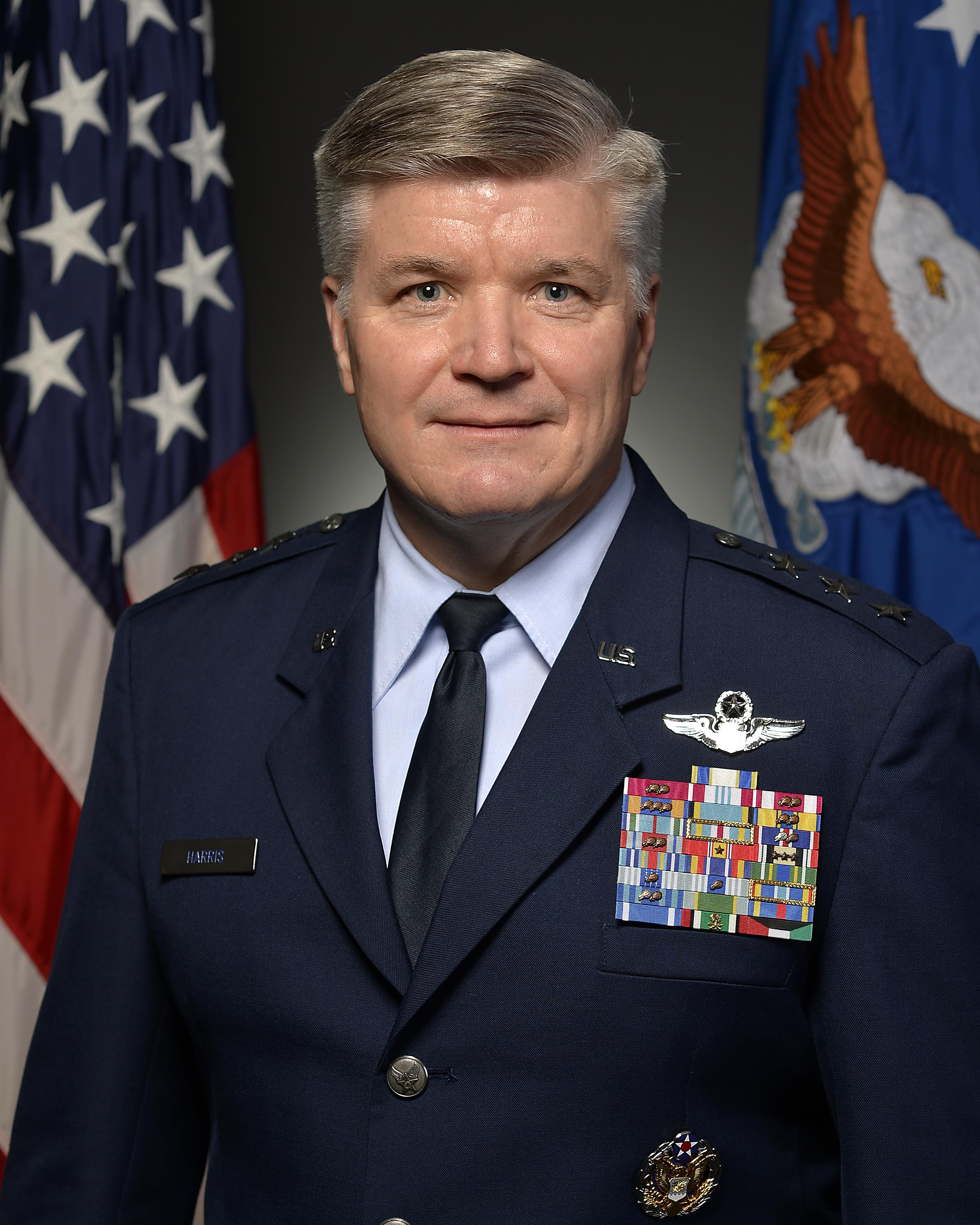
- Official portrait, 2017
- Military career
- Allegiance: United States
- Branch: United States Air Force
- Service years: 1985–2019
- Rank: Lieutenant General
- Commands: 56th Fighter Wing; 8th Fighter Wing; 505th Training Group; 79th Fighter Squadron
- Awards: Air Force Distinguished Service Medal; Bronze Star Medal (3)

Jerry D. Harris Jr. is a retired United States Air Force lieutenant general who last served as the Deputy Chief of Staff for Plans and Programs of the United States Air Force. Prior to that, he was the Deputy Chief of Staff for Strategic Plans, Programs, and Requirements of the United States Air Force.

Military offices
| Preceded by Kurt F. Neubauer | Commander of the 56th Fighter Wing; 2010–2012 | Succeeded by Michael D. Rothstein |
| Preceded by John W. Raymond | Vice Commander of the 5th Air Force; 2012–2014 | Succeeded by David A. Krumm |
| Preceded by Michael R. Boera | Director of Programs of the United States Air Force; 2014–2015 | Succeeded by ??? |
| Preceded by James N. Post III | Vice Commander of the Air Combat Command; 2015–2017 | Succeeded by John K. McMullen |
| Preceded by James M. Holmes | Deputy Chief of Staff for Strategic Plans, Programs, and Requirements of the United States Air Force; 2017–2019 | Succeeded by David S. Nahom as Deputy Chief of Staff for Plans and Programs |
