= Jeffrey L. Harrigian =

United States Air Force general (born 1962)

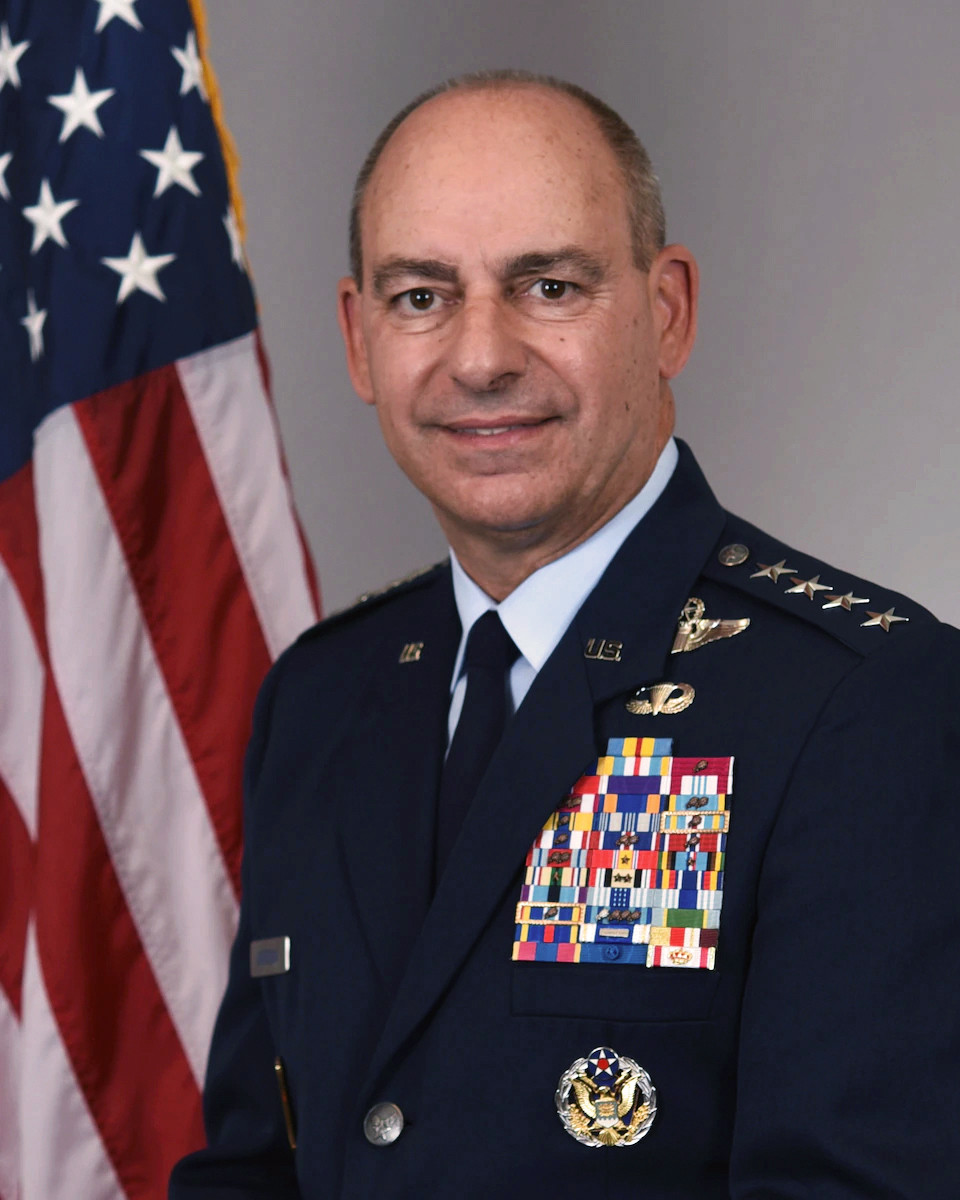
- Official portrait, 2022
- Born: 1962 (age 63–64)
- Military career
- Allegiance: United States
- Branch: United States Air Force
- Service years: 1985–2022
- Rank: General
- Commands: United States Air Forces in Europe – Air Forces Africa; Air Forces Central Command; 49th Fighter Wing; 43rd Fighter Squadron
- Conflicts: Iraq War
- Awards: Defense Distinguished Service Medal (2); Air Force Distinguished Service Medal; Defense Superior Service Medal; Legion of Merit (2); Bronze Star Medal; Purple Heart

Jeffrey Lee Harrigian (born 1962) is a retired United States Air Force (USAF) general who last served as the commander of United States Air Forces in Europe and Air Forces Africa from May 2020 to June 2022. He concurrently served as the commander of Allied Air Command and director of the Joint Air Power Competence Center. He previously served as deputy commander and as commander of United States Air Forces Central Command. Raised in Sparks, Nevada, he graduated from the United States Air Force Academy with a degree in International Affairs and was commissioned in 1985. He assumed his capstone assignment on May 1, 2019.

== Personal life ==
Harrigian is of Armenian descent. Responding to a query about his Armenian heritage, Harrigian wrote: "My grandparents on my Dad's side came from the Yerevan area in Armenia." He also mentioned that he "grew up eating Armenian food almost every weekend in my Dad's parents' house”.

== Military career ==
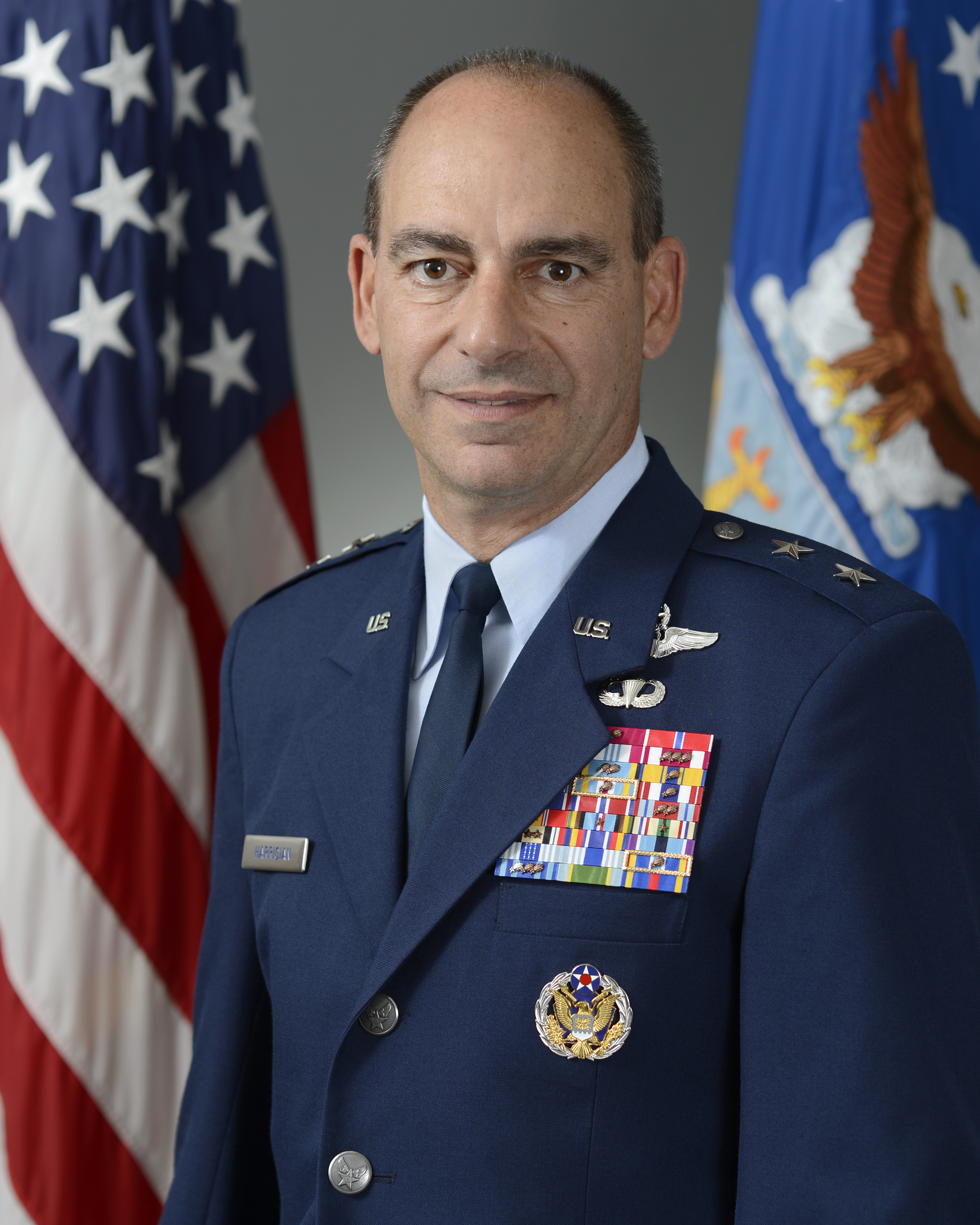
Harrigian photo in 2014

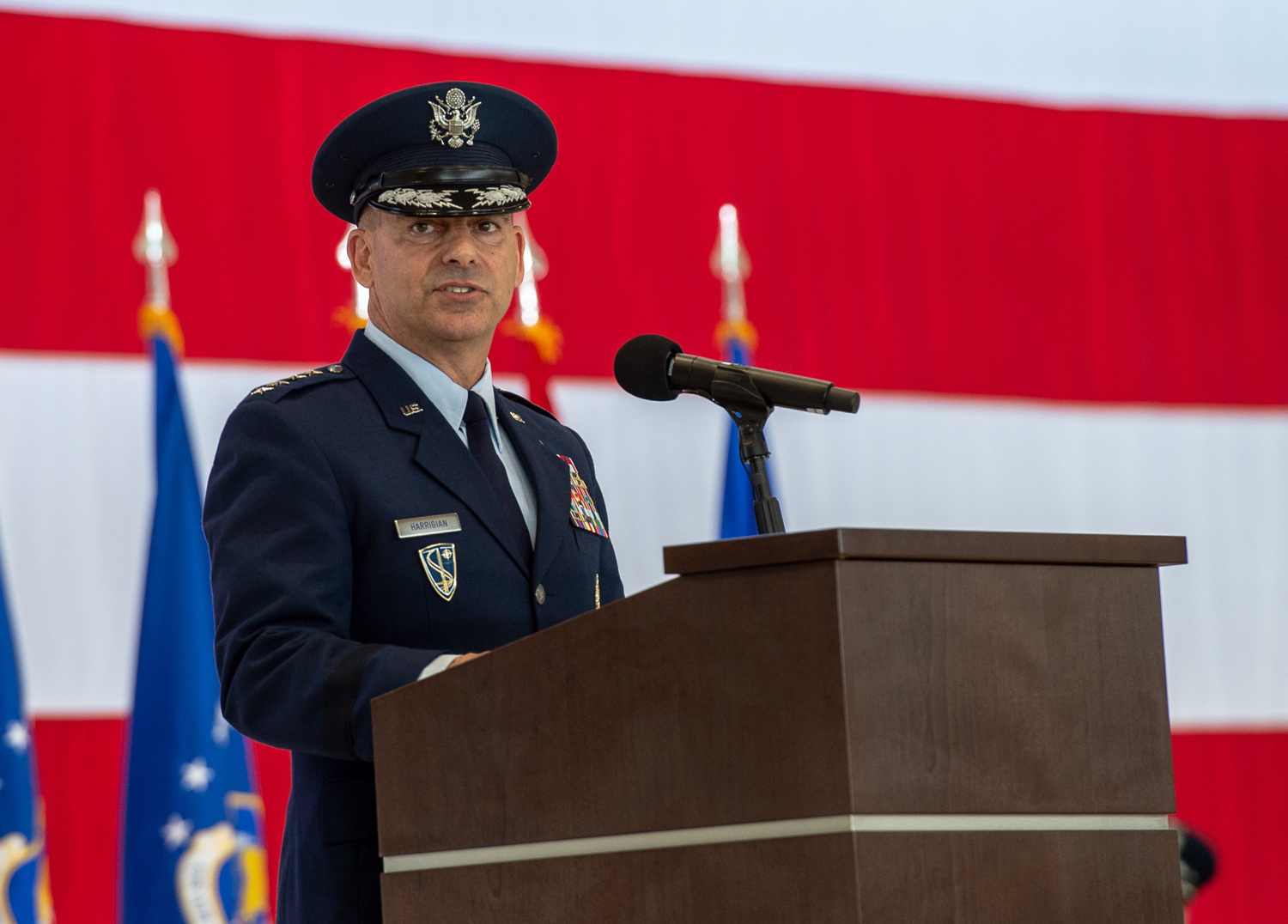
General Jeffrey L. Harrigian speaks at Ramstein Air Force Base, Germany, May 1, 2019.

Harrigian was commissioned in 1985 as a graduate of the United States Air Force Academy. He has served in a variety of flying and staff assignments, including Deputy Director for Strategy, Plans and Assessments, United States Forces-Iraq, in support of operation Iraqi Freedom and as Chief of the Joint Exercise Division at NATO's Joint Warfare Center, Stavanger, Norway. He has commanded at the flight, squadron and wing levels. He has flown combat missions in support of operations Just Cause, Desert Storm and Inherent Resolve. He served as Deputy Director of Operations (J3) at United States Central Command, MacDill Air Force Base, Florida. He also served as Director, F-35 Integration Office, Headquarters U.S. Air Force, the Pentagon, Arlington, Virginia. He is a command pilot with more than 4,100 hours in the F-22, F-15C, A/OA-37 and MQ-1.

Harrigian was Commander, United States Air Forces Central Command, Combined Force Air Component Commander United States Central Command, Southwest Asia, from 2016 to 2018. He was then appointed as the Deputy Commander, United States Air Forces in Europe-Air Forces Africa, Ramstein Air Base, Germany. As the air component to United States European Command and U.S. Africa Command, USAFE-AFAFRICA is responsible for providing full-spectrum warfighting capabilities to both combatant commanders throughout their area of responsibility, which encompasses 104 countries in Europe, Africa, Asia and the Middle East, the Arctic and Atlantic oceans and possesses more than a quarter of the world's population and world's gross domestic product.

On 25 March 2019, Harrigian was nominated for promotion to general and assignment as commander of United States Air Forces in Europe – Air Forces Africa and director of the Joint Air Power Competence Center.

== Education ==
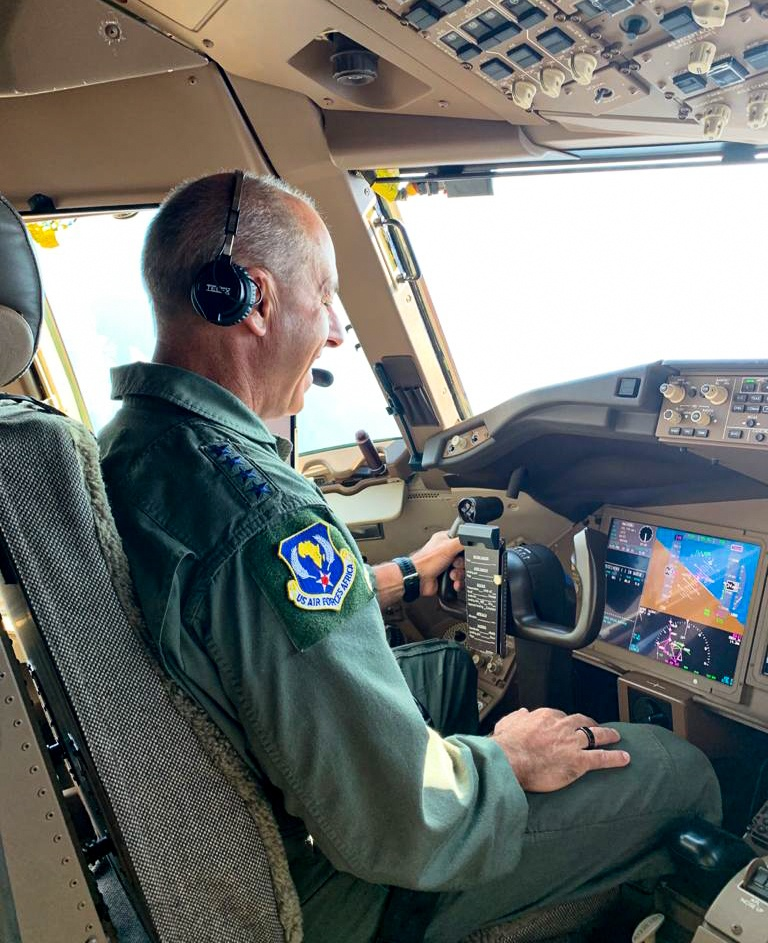
General Jeffrey Harrigian piloting a Boeing KC-46 Pegasus.

- 1985 Bachelor's degree in political science, U.S. Air Force Academy, Colorado Springs, Colo.
- 1993 Squadron Officer School, Maxwell Air Force Base, Ala., by correspondence
- 1995 U.S. Air Force Fighter Weapons Instructor Course, Nellis Air Force Base, Nev.
- 1999 Army Command and General Staff College, Fort Leavenworth, Kan.
- 2002 Air War College, Maxwell AFB, Ala., by correspondence
- 2005 Air Force Fellow, George C. Marshall European Center for Security Studies, Garmisch-Partenkirchen, Germany
- 2008 Enterprise Leadership Seminar, University of North Carolina at Chapel Hill
- 2008 Phase II, Joint Professional Military Education, Joint Forces Staff College, Norfolk, Va.
- 2011 Joint Force Air Component Commander Course, Maxwell AFB, Ala.
- 2012 Joint Flag Officer Warfighting Course, Maxwell AFB, Ala.
- 2015 Combined/Joint Force Special Operations Component Commanders Course, MacDill AFB, Fla.
- 2017 Pinnacle Course, National Defense University, Fort Lesley J. McNair, Washington, D.C.
- 2018 Leadership at the Peak, Arosa, Switzerland

== Assignments ==
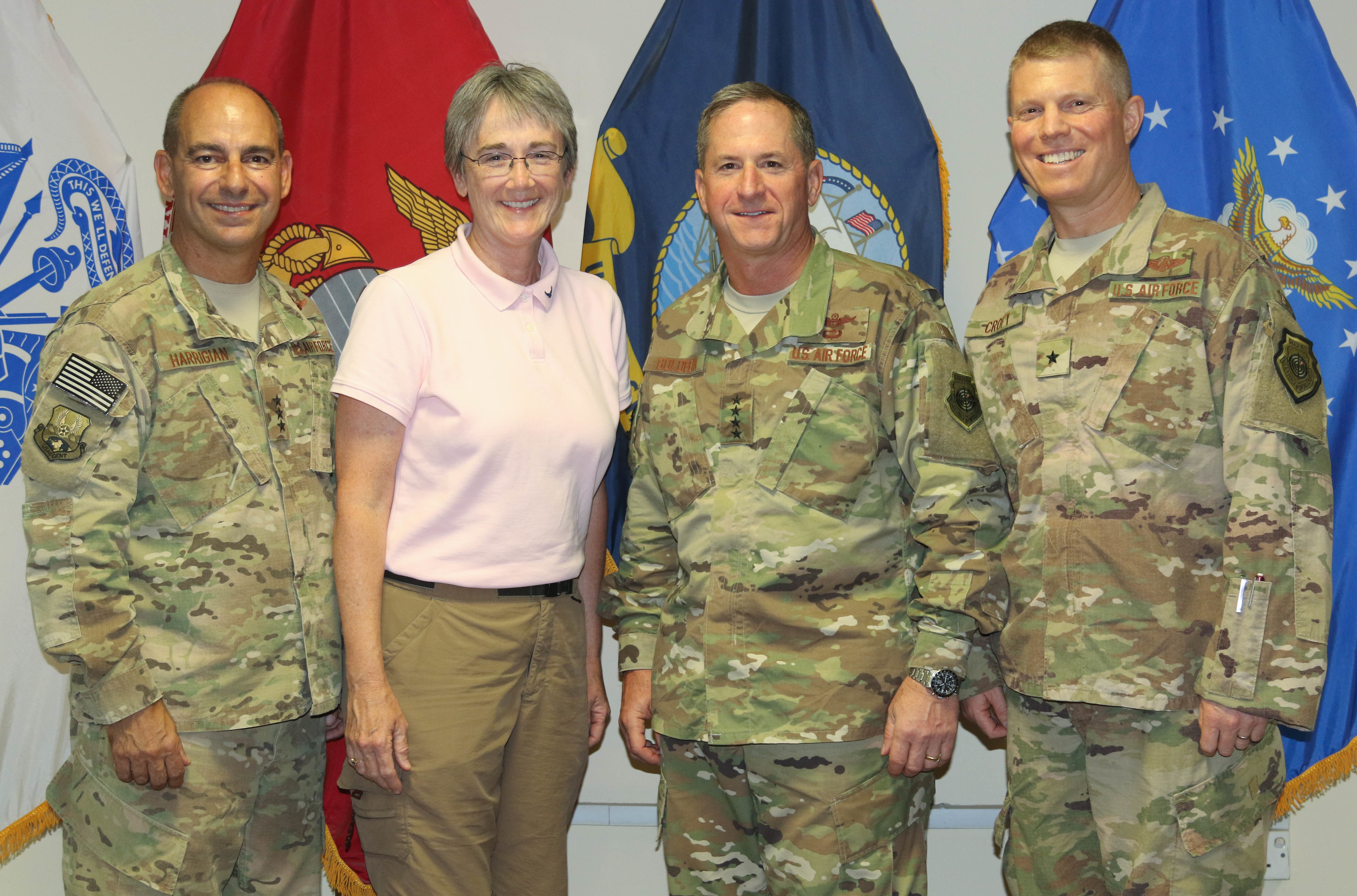
Lieutenant General Jeffrey L. Harrigian during his tenure as commander of U.S. Air Forces Central Command with Secretary of the Air Force Dr. Heather Wilson and United States Air Force Chief of Staff General David L. Goldfein and Deputy Commanding General for Combined Forces Land Component Command Brigadier General Andrew A. Croft at Al-Asad Airbase, Baghdad, Iraq on August 19, 2017.

1. July 1985 – August 1986, Student, Undergraduate Pilot Training, Williams Air Force Base, Ariz.
2. April 1987 – January 1990, A/AO-37 Air Liaison Officer, forward air controller instructor pilot, and standardization and evaluation pilot, 24th Tactical Air Support Squadron, Howard AFB, Panama
3. March 1990 – September 1990, Student, F-15 replacement training, 555th Tactical Fighter Squadron, Luke AFB, Ariz.
4. September 1990 – June 1992, Squadron Life Support Officer, Chief, Squadron Scheduling, 8th Tactical Fighter Squadron, Holloman AFB, N.M.
5. July 1992 – June 1995, Chief, Squadron Scheduling, 1st Tactical Fighter Squadron, and Academic Instructor, Multi-stage Improvement Program, 325th Training Squadron, Tyndall AFB, Fla.
6. July 1995 – December 1995, Student, U.S. Air Force Weapons Instructor Course, Nellis AFB, Nev.
7. January 1996 – June 1998, Chief, Weapons and Tactic, 58th Fighter Squadron, and Chief, Wing, Weapons, 33rd Operational Support Squadron, Eglin AFB, Fla.
8. June 1998 – June 1999, Student, Army Command and General Staff College, Fort Leavenworth, Kan.
9. June 1999 – August 1999, Student, F-15 requalification training, Tyndall AFB, Fla.
10. August 1999 – January 2000, instructor pilot, F-15 Division; and Chief, Advanced Programs, Director of Tactics, U.S. Air Force Weapons School, Nellis AFB, Nev.
11. January 2000 – May 2001, Operations Officer, F-15 Division, U.S. Air Force Weapons School, Nellis AFB, Nev.
12. May 2001 – October 2002, Operations Officer, 95th Fighter Squadron, Tyndall AFB, Fla.
13. October 2002 – December 2004, Commander, 43rd Fighter Squadron, Tyndall AFB, Fla.
14. December 2004 – August 2005, Air Force Fellow, George C. Marshall European Center for Security Studies, Garmisch-Partenkirchen, Germany
15. August 2005 – June 2007, Chief, Joint Exercise Division, NATO's Joint Warfare Center, Stavanger, Norway
16. June 2007 – January 2008, Vice Commander, 1st Fighter Wing, Langley AFB, Va.
17. January 2008 – June 2010, Commander, 49th Fighter Wing, Holloman AFB, N.M.
18. July 2010 – July 2011, Deputy Director for Strategy, Plans and Assessment (J5), U.S. Forces-Iraq, Baghdad, Iraq
19. August 2011 – January 2013, Assistant Deputy Commander, U.S. Air Forces Central Command, and Assistant Vice Commander, 9th Air Expeditionary Task Force, Shaw AFB, S.C.
20. February 2013 – July 2014, Deputy Director, Operations (J3), U.S. Central Command, Mac Dill AFB, Fla.
21. August 2014 – April 2015, Assistant Deputy Chief of Staff for Operations, Headquarters U.S. Air Force, the Pentagon, Arlington, Va.
22. April 2015 – July 2016, Director, F-35 Integration Office, Headquarters U.S. Air Force, the Pentagon, Arlington, Va.
23. July 2016 – August 2018, Commander, U.S. Air Forces Central Command, Combined Force Air Component Commander, U.S. Central Command, Southwest Asia.
24. September 2018 – April 2019, Deputy Commander, U.S. Air Forces in Europe-Air Forces Africa, Ramstein AB, Germany
25. May 2019 – June 2022, Commander, United States Air Forces Europe; Commander, United States Air Forces Africa; Commander, Allied Air Command; and Director, Joint Air Power Competence Centre, Ramstein AB, Germany

== Flight information ==
Rating: Command pilot
Flight hours: More than 4,100.
Aircraft flown: F-22, F-15C, A/OA-37 and MQ-1.

== Awards and decorations ==
US Air Force Command Pilot Badge
Basic Parachutist Badge
Headquarters Air Force Badge
Allied Air Command Badge

Defense Distinguished Service Medal with one bronze oak leaf cluster
Air Force Distinguished Service Medal
Defense Superior Service Medal
Legion of Merit with oak leaf cluster
Bronze Star Medal
Purple Heart
Defense Meritorious Service Medal
Meritorious Service Medal with three oak leaf clusters
Air Medal
Aerial Achievement Medal with two oak leaf clusters
Air Force Commendation Medal with oak leaf cluster
Air Force Achievement Medal
Joint Meritorious Unit Award with oak leaf cluster
Air Force Meritorious Unit Award with oak leaf cluster
Air Force Outstanding Unit Award with two oak leaf clusters
Air Force Organizational Excellence Award with oak leaf cluster
Combat Readiness Medal with two oak leaf clusters
National Defense Service Medal with one bronze service star
Armed Forces Expeditionary Medal with one service star
Southwest Asia Service Medal with one service star
Iraq Campaign Medal with two service stars
Global War on Terrorism Service Medal
Humanitarian Service Medal
Air Force Overseas Short Tour Service Ribbon
Air Force Overseas Long Tour Service Ribbon
Air Force Expeditionary Service Ribbon with gold frame and oak leaf cluster
Air Force Longevity Service Award with one silver and three bronze oak leaf clusters
Small Arms Expert Marksmanship Ribbon
Air Force Training Ribbon
Qatar Military Gallantry Decoration of the First Degree
French National Order of Merit, Officer
National Defence Medal in gold (France)
Cross of Aeronautical Merit, Spain (Grand Cross with White Decoration)
NATO Meritorious Service Medal

== Effective dates of promotion ==
Promotions
Insignia	Rank	Date
	General	May 1, 2019
	Lieutenant General	July 22, 2016
	Major General	February 7, 2014
	Brigadier General	November 11, 2010
	Colonel	February 1, 2006
	Lieutenant Colonel	May 1, 2000
	Major	January 1, 1997
	Captain	May 29, 1989
	First Lieutenant	May 29, 1987
	Second Lieutenant	May 29, 1985

== Other achievements ==
1986 Distinguished Graduate, Undergraduate Pilot Training
1989 O/A-37 Instructor Pilot of the Year, Tactical Air Command
1995 Outstanding Graduate, U.S. Air Force Weapons School
1996 Air Force Anthony C. Shine Award
1997 Safety Award of Distinction, Air Combat Command
1998 Ten Outstanding Young Americans Award, Air Combat Command
1998 Instructor Pilot of the Year, 33rd Fighter Wing

== Publication ==
"Fighting the Fulcrum," Fighter Weapons Review and AFTTP 3–1, Vol. 4.

Military offices
Preceded by David L. Goldfein	Commander of the 49th Fighter Wing; 2008–2010	Succeeded by David A. Krumm
Preceded by ???	Assistant Deputy Commander of the United States Air Forces Central Command; 2011–2013	Succeeded by Scott L. Dennis
Preceded by Charles Q. Brown Jr.	Deputy Director of Operations of the United States Central Command; 2013–2014	Succeeded by Sean M. Jenkins
Preceded by James J. Jones	Assistant Deputy Chief of Staff for Operations of the United States Air Force; 2014–2015	Succeeded by Scott Vander Hamm
Preceded by Carl E. Schaefer	Director of F-35 Integration of the United States Air Force; 2015–2016	Succeeded by Todd D. Canterbury
Preceded by Charles Q. Brown Jr.	Commander of the United States Air Forces Central Command; 2016–2018	Succeeded by Joseph T. Guastella
Preceded by Timothy G. Fay	Deputy Commander of the United States Air Forces in Europe – Air Forces Africa; 2018–2019	Succeeded by Steven L. Basham
Preceded by Tod D. Wolters	Commander of the United States Air Forces in Europe – Air Forces Africa; 2019–2022	Succeeded by James B. Hecker
