= David S. Nahom =

U.S. Air Force Lieutenant General (born 1966)

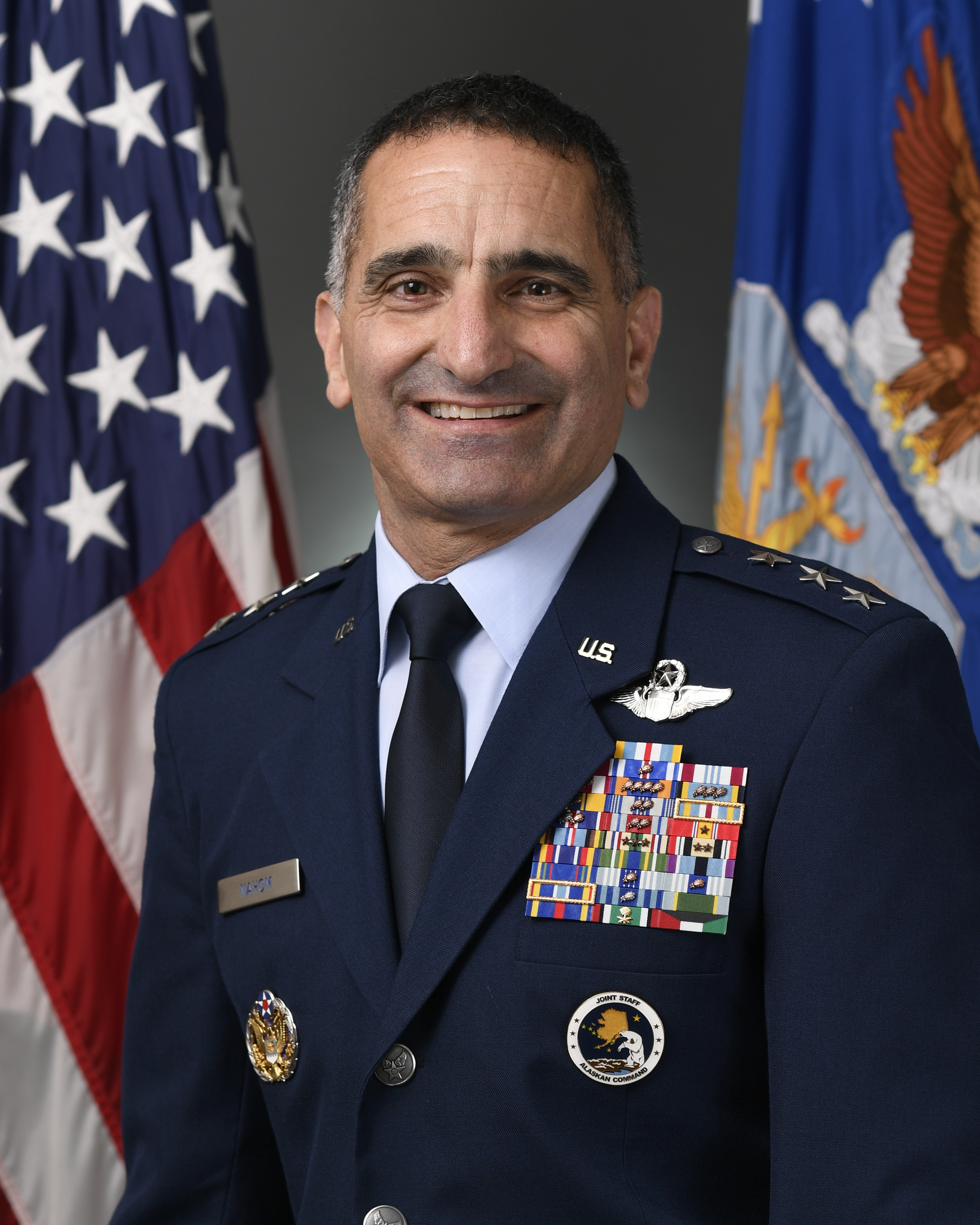
- Born: 1966 (age 59–60); Brookfield, Connecticut, U.S.
- Military career
- Allegiance: United States
- Branch: United States Air Force
- Service years: 1988–2024
- Rank: Lieutenant General
- Commands: Alaskan North American Aerospace Defense Region; Alaskan Command; Eleventh Air Force; 3rd Wing; 18th Operations Group; 60th Fighter Squadron
- Conflicts: Gulf War; Iraq War
- Awards: Air Force Distinguished Service Medal; Defense Superior Service Medal (2); Legion of Merit (2); Distinguished Flying Cross (2)

David Sisto Nahom is a retired United States Air Force lieutenant general who served as the commander of the Alaskan Command, Eleventh Air Force, and Alaskan North American Aerospace Defense Region. He previously served as the deputy chief of staff for plans and programs from 2019 to 2022.

Nahom was born in Brookfield, Connecticut and attended the University of Colorado.

== Effective dates of promotions ==
Rank	Date
Second Lieutenant	August 13, 1988
First Lieutenant	August 13, 1990
Captain	August 13, 1992
Major	December 1, 1999
Lieutenant Colonel	April 1, 2004
Colonel	July 1, 2009
Brigadier General	October 17, 2014
Major General	June 2, 2018
Lieutenant General	September 4, 2019

Military offices
Preceded by Dirk D. Smith	Commander of the 3rd Wing; 2013–2014	Succeeded by Charles Corcoran
Preceded by Lawrence M. Martin Jr.	Director of Regional Affairs of the Office of the Deputy Under Secretary of the Air Force for International Affairs; 2014–2015	Succeeded by ???
Preceded by ???	Deputy Director of Plans, Programs and Requirements of the Air Combat Command; 2016–2017	Succeeded by Robert G. Novotny
Preceded by Jay B. Silveria	Deputy Commander of the United States Air Forces Central Command; 2017–2018	Succeeded by Gregory M. Guillot
Preceded by Stephen A. Clark	Director of Programs of the United States Air Force; 2018–2019	Succeeded by Richard G. Moore
Preceded by Jerry D. Harris Jr.	Deputy Chief of Staff for Plans and Programs of the United States Air Force; 2019–2022	Succeeded by Richard G. Moore
Preceded by David A. Krumm	Commander of the Alaskan North American Aerospace Defense Region, Alaskan Command, and Eleventh Air Force; 2022–2024	Succeeded by Case Cunningham
