= Craig D. Wills =

U.S. Air Force general

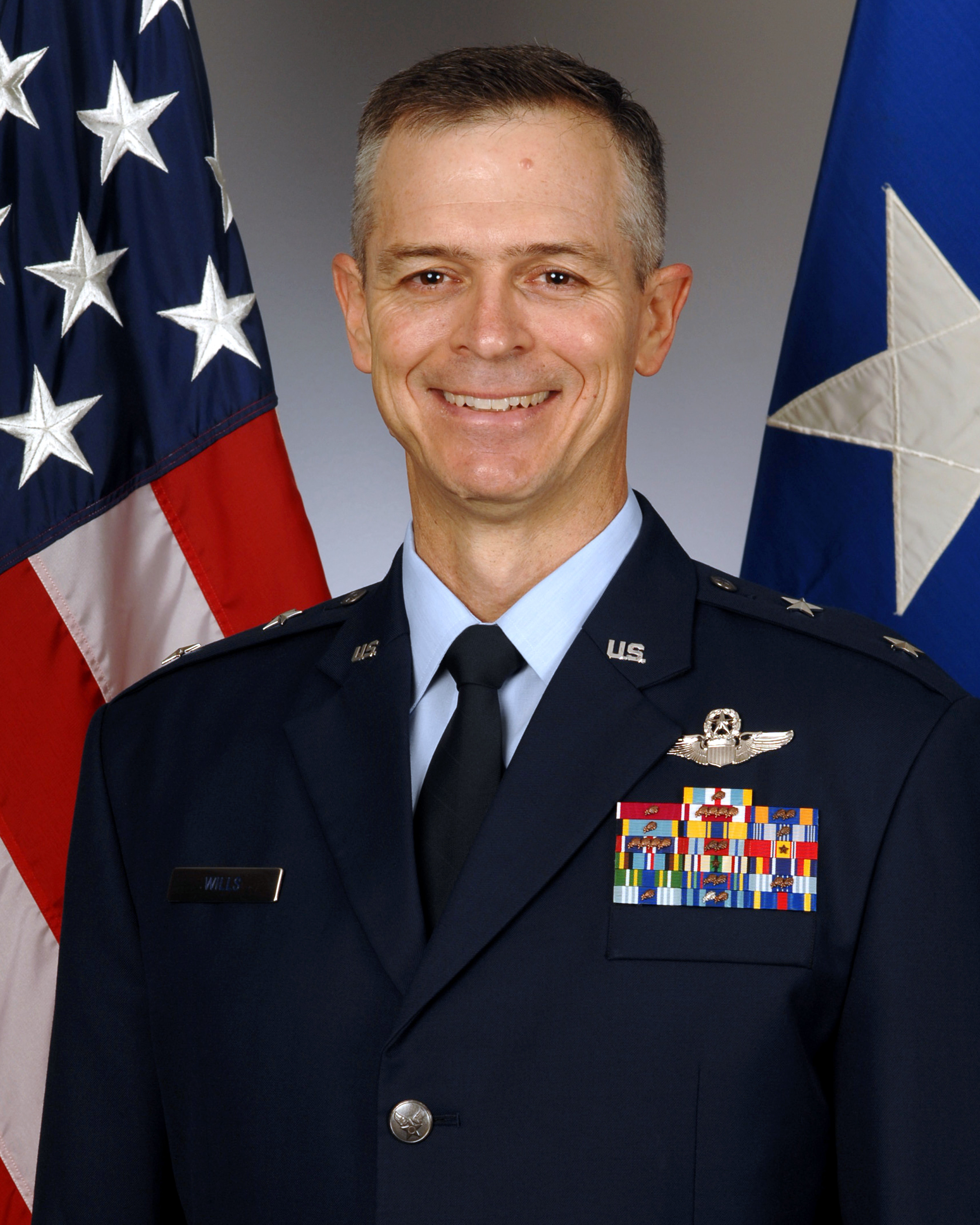
- Military career
- Allegiance: United States
- Branch: United States Air Force
- Service years: 1990–2022
- Rank: Major General
- Commands: Nineteenth Air Force; 39th Air Base Wing; 47th Operations Group
- Awards: Defense Superior Service Medal (2); Legion of Merit (2)

Craig D. Wills is a retired United States Air Force major general who served as the commander of the Nineteenth Air Force from 2019 to 2022. He previously served as the Deputy Chief of the Office of Security Cooperation – Iraq.

Military offices
Preceded by Gregory M. Guillot	Director of Strategic Plans, Requirements, and Programs of the Pacific Air Forces; 2016–2018	Succeeded by Michael P. Winkler
Preceded by S. Clinton Hinote	Deputy Chief of the Office of Security Cooperation – Iraq; 2018–2019	Succeeded by Gregory Kreuder
Preceded by Patrick J. Doherty	Commander of the Nineteenth Air Force; 2019–2022	Succeeded by Phillip A. Stewart
