= Lance K. Landrum =

United States Air Force general (born 1970)

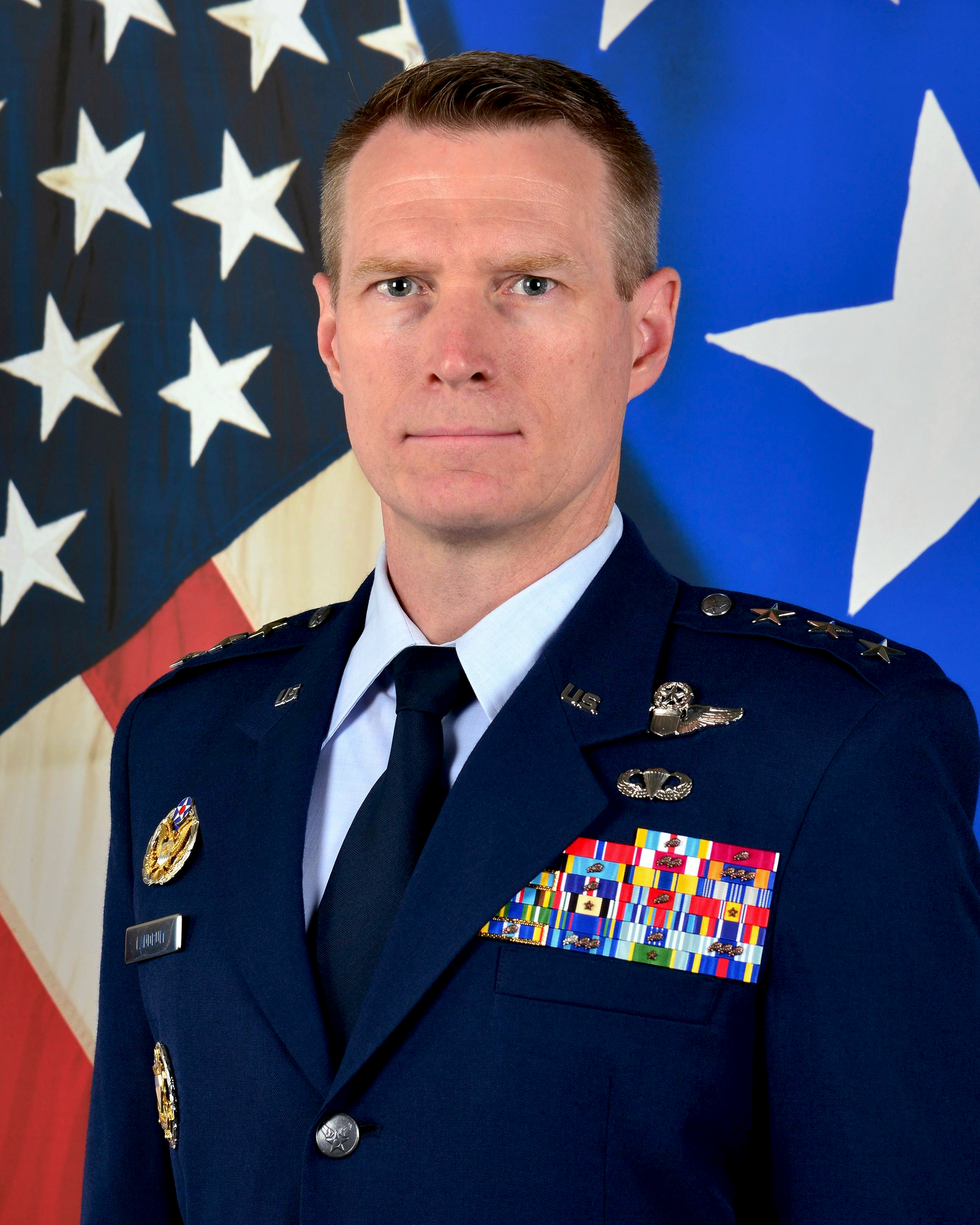
- Official portrait, 2022
- Born: c. 1970 (age 55–56); Perrysburg, Ohio, U.S.
- Alma mater: United States Air Force Academy (BS); Embry-Riddle (MS); Air War College (MS)
- Military career
- Allegiance: United States
- Branch: United States Air Force
- Service years: 1992–2023
- Rank: Lieutenant General
- Commands: Deputy Chair of the NATO Military Committee; 31st Fighter Wing; 388th Fighter Wing; 332nd Expeditionary Operations Group; 510th Fighter Squadron
- Conflicts: Iraq War
- Awards: Defense Superior Service Medal (2); Legion of Merit (2); Bronze Star Medal

Lance Keith Landrum (born c. 1970) is a retired United States Air Force lieutenant general who served as the 23rd Deputy Chair of the NATO Military Committee from 2021 to 2023. He most recently served as a special assistant to the commander of the United States European Command and prior to that served as the Director of Operations (J3) for United States European Command from July 2020 to July 2021.

Landrum earned his commission in May 1992 from the United States Air Force Academy. He has held a variety of positions in F-16 fighter operations at the squadron, group and wing levels. He is a graduate of the United States Air Force Weapons School, commanded the 510th Fighter Squadron, Aviano Air Base, Italy, and the 332nd Expeditionary Operations Group, Joint Base Balad, Iraq. Landrum also commanded the 388th Fighter Wing, Hill Air Force Base, Utah and the 31st Fighter Wing, Aviano AB, Italy. His duties have included assignments to the Pentagon as the Aide de Camp to the Chief of Staff of the Air Force, the Director of the U.S. Air Force Colonels Management Office, and Joint Staff J8 Deputy Director for Requirements and Capability Development.

Landrum is a command pilot with more than 2,800 flying hours, including 395 combat hours.

== Education ==
- 1992 Bachelor of Science, Engineering Mechanics, U.S. Air Force Academy, Colorado Springs, Colo.
- 2001 Masters in Aeronautical Science, Management, Embry-Riddle Aeronautical University, Daytona Beach, Fla.
- 2001 Squadron Officer School, Maxwell Air Force Base, Ala.
- 2003 Air Command and Staff College, Maxwell AFB, Ala., by correspondence
- 2010 Master of Science, Strategic Studies, Air War College, Maxwell AFB, Ala.
- 2015 Leadership Decision Making Program, Harvard Kennedy School, Harvard University
- 2018 Global/Regional Course – Africa, Alan L. Freed Associates, Washington, D.C.
- 2018 Combined Forces Air Component Commander's Course, Maxwell AFB, Ala.
- 2019 Enterprise Leadership Program, Kenan-Flagler Business School, University of North Carolina at Chapel Hill
- 2019 US-UK 1-Star Rising Leaders Forum

== Military assignments ==
1. August 1992 – September 1993, Student, Undergraduate Pilot Training, Vance Air Force Base, Okla.
2. October 1993 – December 1993, Student, Fighter Lead-in Training, 49th Flying Training Squadron, Columbus AFB, Miss.
3. January 1994 – December 1994, F-16 Student, Replacement Training Unit, 61st Fighter Squadron, Luke AFB, Ariz.
4. December 1994 – December 1995, F-16 Pilot, Assistant Weapons Officer, Scheduler, 36th Fighter Squadron, Osan Air Base, South Korea
5. January 1996 – August 1998, F-16 Instructor Pilot, Assistant Weapons Officer, Scheduler, 4th Fighter Squadron, Hill AFB, Utah
6. January 1999 – June 1999, F-16 Student, U.S. Air Force Weapons School, Nellis AFB, Nev.
7. June 1999 – March 2002, F-16 Instructor Pilot, Chief of Weapons, 310th Fighter Squadron, Luke AFB, Ariz.
8. March 2002 – June 2003, F-16 Instructor Pilot, Flight Commander, U.S. Air Force Weapons School, Nellis AFB, Nev.
9. July 2003 – September 2005, Aide to the Chief of Staff, Headquarters U.S. Air Force, the Pentagon, Arlington, Va.
10. November 2005 – June 2009, 31st Fighter Wing Chief of Plans, 555th Fighter Squadron Operations Officer, 510th Fighter Squadron Commander, Aviano AB, Italy
11. July 2009 – May 2010, Student, Air War College, Maxwell AFB, Ala.
12. June 2010 – June 2011, Commander, 332nd Expeditionary Operations Group, Joint Base Balad, Iraq
13. August 2011 – June 2013, Senior Military Advisor, U.S. Mission to NATO
14. June 2013 – June 2015, Commander, 388th Fighter Wing, Hill AFB, Utah
15. July 2015 – June 2016, Director of the U.S. Air Force Colonels Management office, Headquarters U.S. Air Force, the Pentagon, Arlington, Va.
16. June 2016 – June 2018, Commander, 31st Fighter Wing, Aviano AB, Italy
17. July 2018 – July 2020, Deputy Director for Requirements and Capability Development (J8), the Joint Staff, Arlington, Va.
18. July 2020–July 2021, Director of Operations (J3), U.S. European Command, Stuttgart, Germany.
19. July 2021–October 2021, Special Assistant to the Commander, U.S. European Command, Stuttgart, Germany.
20. October 2021–October 2023, Deputy Chair, NATO Military Committee, Brussels, Belgium

== Effective dates of promotion ==
Insignia	Rank	Date of rank
	Second Lieutenant	27 May 1992
	First Lieutenant	27 May 1994
	Captain	27 May 1996
	Major	1 November 2002
	Lieutenant Colonel	1 December 2006
	Colonel	1 October 2010
	Brigadier General	12 August 2016
	Major General	2 November 2019
	Lieutenant General	11 October 2021

Military offices
Preceded by Scott Long	Commander of the 388th Fighter Wing; 2013–2015	Succeeded by David B. Lyons
Preceded by Barre Seguin	Commander of the 31st Fighter Wing; 2016–2018	Succeeded by Daniel Lasica
Preceded by David A. Krumm	Deputy Director for Requirements and Capability Development of the Joint Staff; 2018–2020	Succeeded by James H. Adams III
Preceded by Michael L. Howard	Director of Operations of the United States European Command; 2020–2021	Succeeded by Adrian L. Spain
Preceded by Scott Kindsvater	Deputy Chair of the NATO Military Committee; 2021–2023	Vacant
