= Stephen C. Williams =

U.S. Air Force general

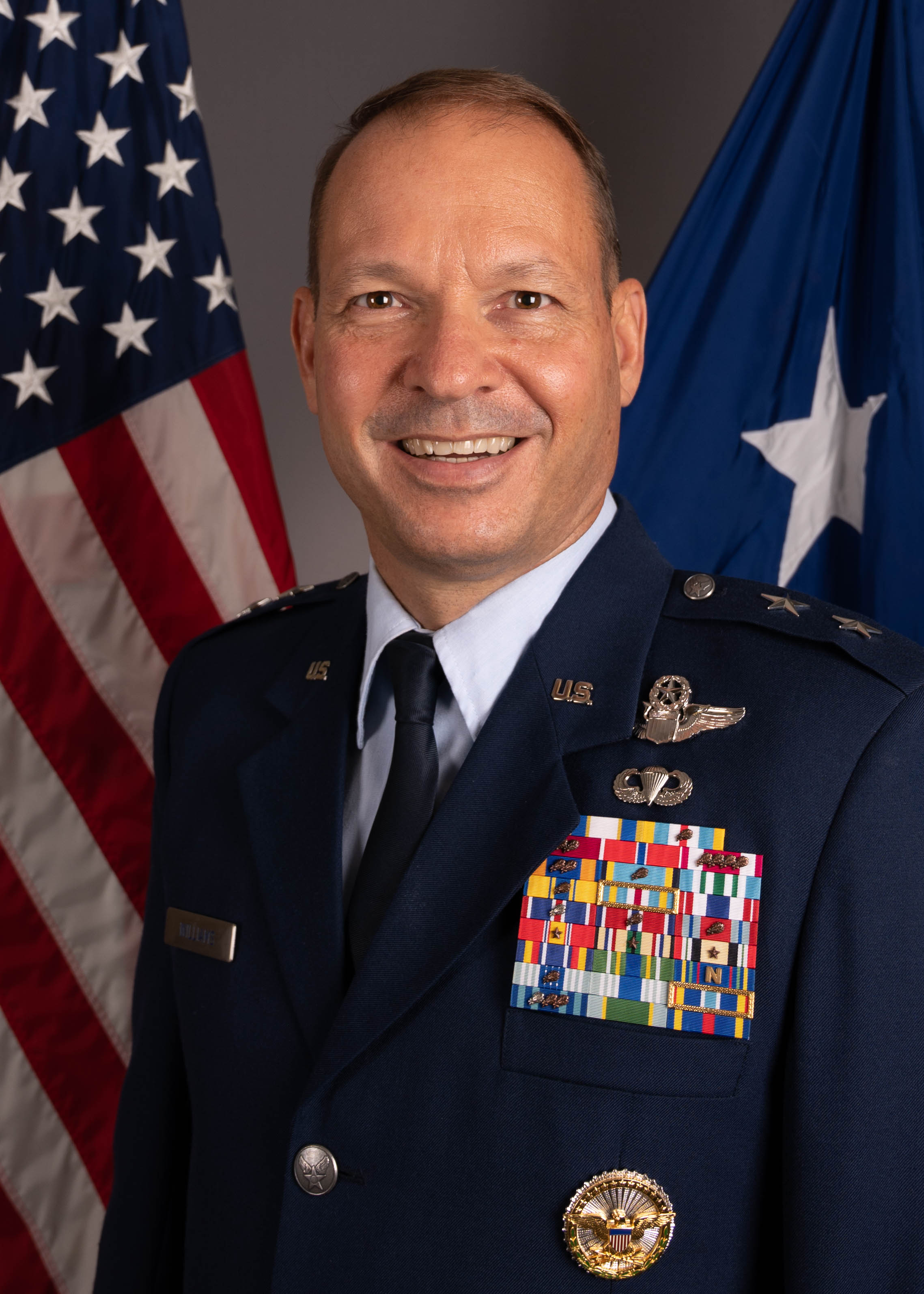
- Official portrait, 2021
- Military career
- Allegiance: United States
- Branch: United States Air Force
- Service years: 1989–2021
- Rank: Major General
- Commands: 35th Fighter Wing; 13th Fighter Squadron
- Awards: Defense Superior Service Medal (4); Legion of Merit

Stephen C. Williams is a retired United States Air Force major general who last served as the special assistant to the commander of Air Combat Command. Previously, he was chief of staff of United States Forces Korea.

Military offices
Preceded by Gregory J. Lengyel	Commandant of Cadets of the United States Air Force Academy; 2014–2017	Succeeded by Kristin E. Goodwin
Preceded by Dirk Smith	Director of Air and Cyberspace Operations of the Pacific Air Forces; 2017–2019	Succeeded by Scott L. Pleus
Preceded by Michael Minihan	Chief of Staff of the United States Forces Korea; 2019–2021	Succeeded by Brad M. Sullivan
Preceded by Andrew A. Croft	Special Assistant to the Commander of the Air Combat Command; 2021	Vacant
