= David A. Krumm =

United States Air Force general

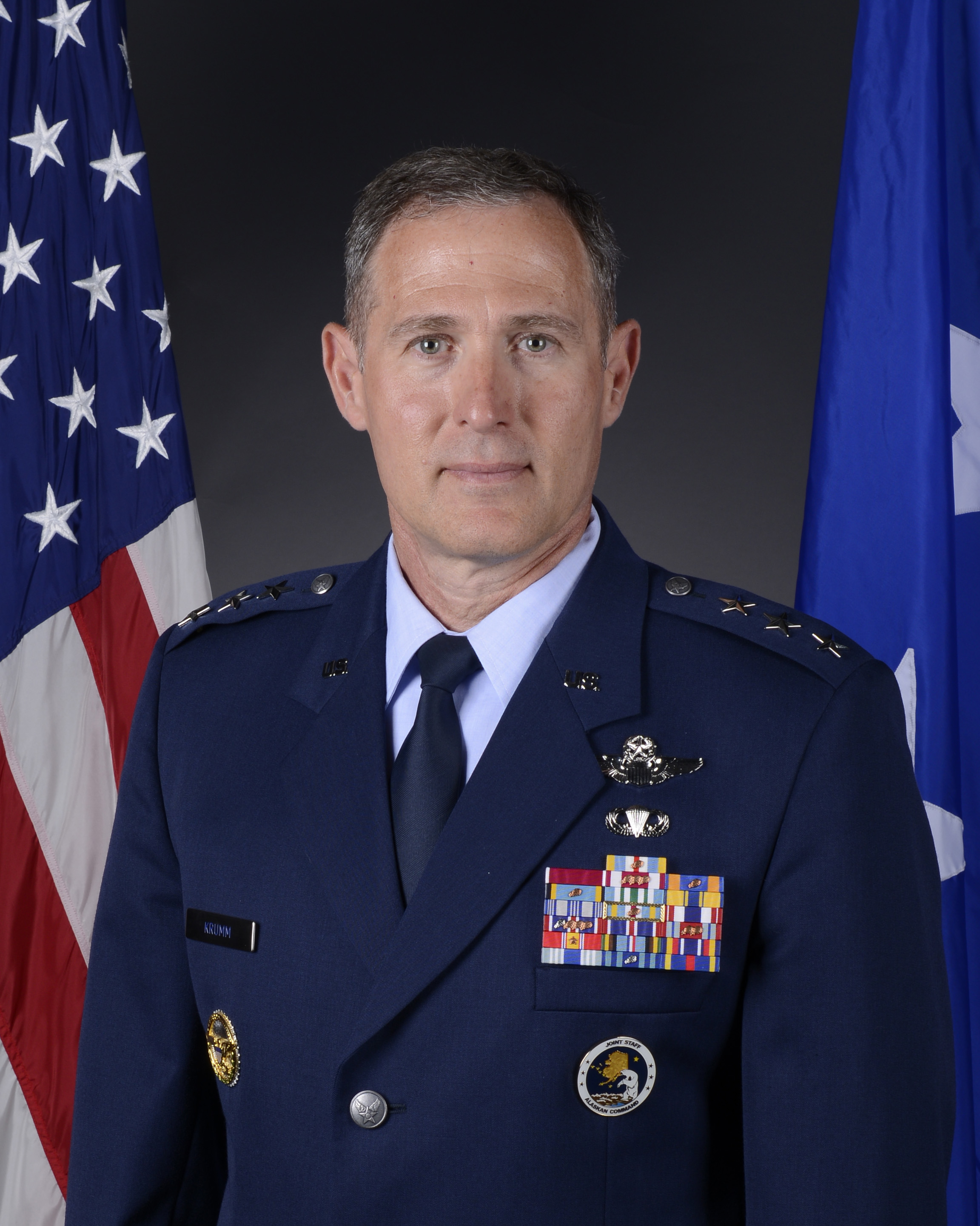
- Official portrait, 2021
- Born: 1967 (age 58–59)
- Spouse: Lisa Blair (m. 1992)
- Military career
- Allegiance: United States
- Branch: United States Air Force
- Service years: 1989–2022
- Rank: Lieutenant General
- Commands: Alaskan Command; Eleventh Air Force; 49th Wing; 43rd Fighter Squadron
- Awards: Defense Superior Service Medal (2); Legion of Merit (2)

David A. Krumm (born 1967) is a retired lieutenant general in the United States Air Force who served as commander, Alaskan Command and Eleventh Air Force. He was commissioned in 1989 through ROTC at Auburn University.

== Effective dates of promotions ==
Rank	Date
Second Lieutenant	December 4, 1989
First Lieutenant	December 4, 1991
Captain	December 4, 1993
Major	March 1, 2001
Lieutenant Colonel	April 1, 2004
Colonel	October 1, 2008
Brigadier General	August 15, 2014
Major General	June 2, 2018
Lieutenant General	April 20, 2020

Military offices
Preceded by Jeffrey L. Harrigian	Commander of the 49th Wing; 2010–2012	Succeeded by Andrew A. Croft
Preceded by Jerry D. Harris	Vice Commander of the Fifth Air Force; 2014–2016	Succeeded by Michael P. Winkler
Preceded by ???	Deputy Director for Requirements and Capability Development of the Joint Staff; 2016–2018	Succeeded by Lance K. Landrum
Preceded by Brian Killough	Director of Strategic Plans of the United States Air Force; 2018–2019	Succeeded by Heather L. Pringle
Preceded by Ryan Britton	Director for Global Power Programs in the Office of the Assistant Secretary Acquisition, Technology & Logistics; 2019–2020	Succeeded by James C. Dawkins
Preceded by Thomas A. Bussiere	Commander of the Eleventh Air Force; 2020–2022	Succeeded by David S. Nahom
