= Patrick J. Doherty =

U.S. Air Force general

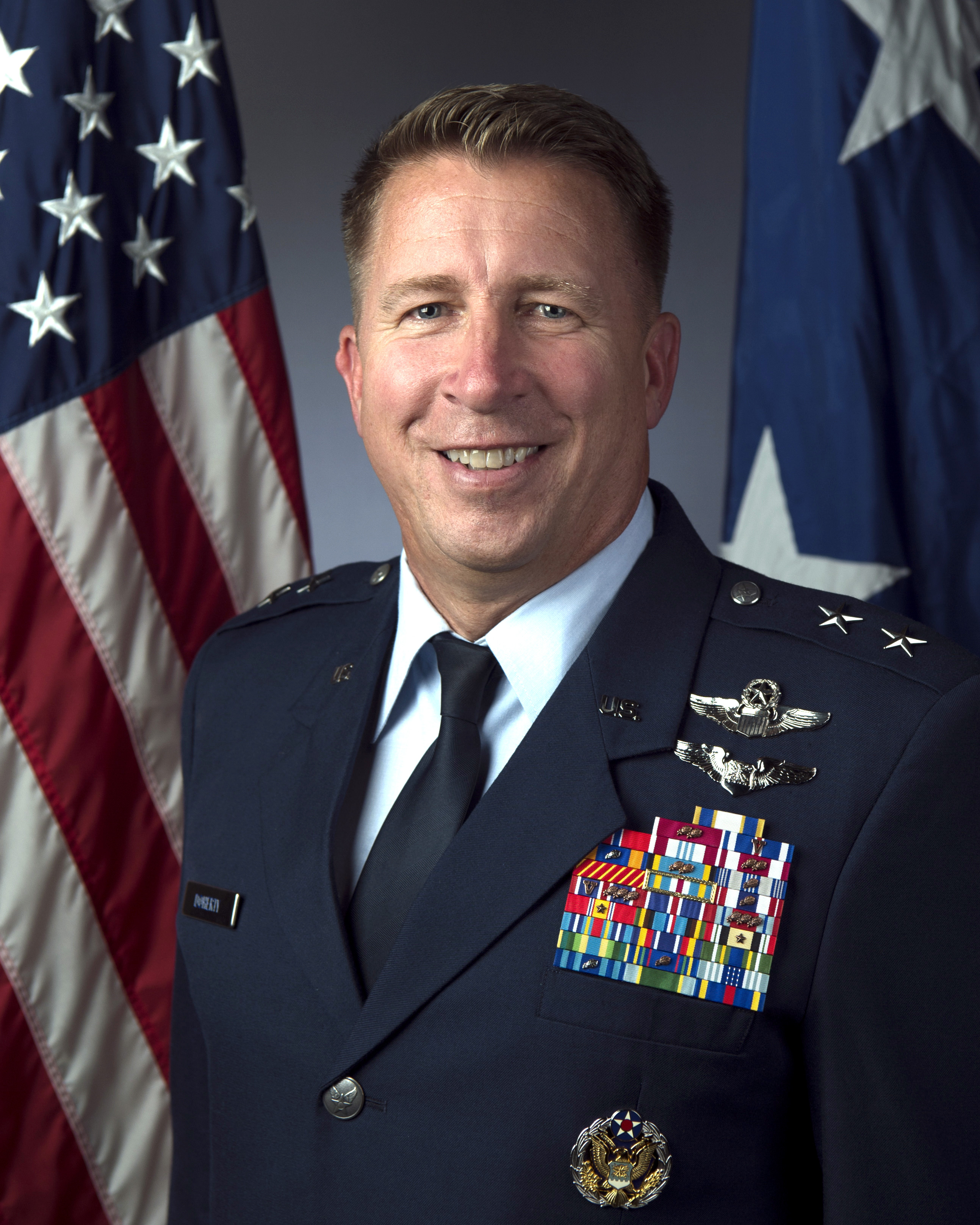
- Military career
- Allegiance: United States
- Branch: United States Air Force
- Service years: 1987–2020
- Rank: Major general
- Commands: 19th Air Force; 82nd Training Wing; 4th Fighter Wing; 334th Fighter Squadron
- Conflicts: Iraq War
- Awards: Air Force Distinguished Service Medal; Legion of Merit (3); Distinguished Flying Cross; Bronze Star Medal

Patrick J. Doherty is a retired United States Air Force major general who last served as the director of plans, programs, requirements, and analysis of the Air Combat Command. Previously, he was the commander of the 19th Air Force.

Military offices
Preceded by Scott Kindsvater	Commander of the 82nd Training Wing; 2015–2017	Succeeded by Ronald Jolly
Preceded by James Hecker	Commander of the Nineteenth Air Force; 2017–2019	Succeeded by Craig D. Wills
