= Nineteenth Air Force =

Numbered air force of the United States Air Force responsible for flying training

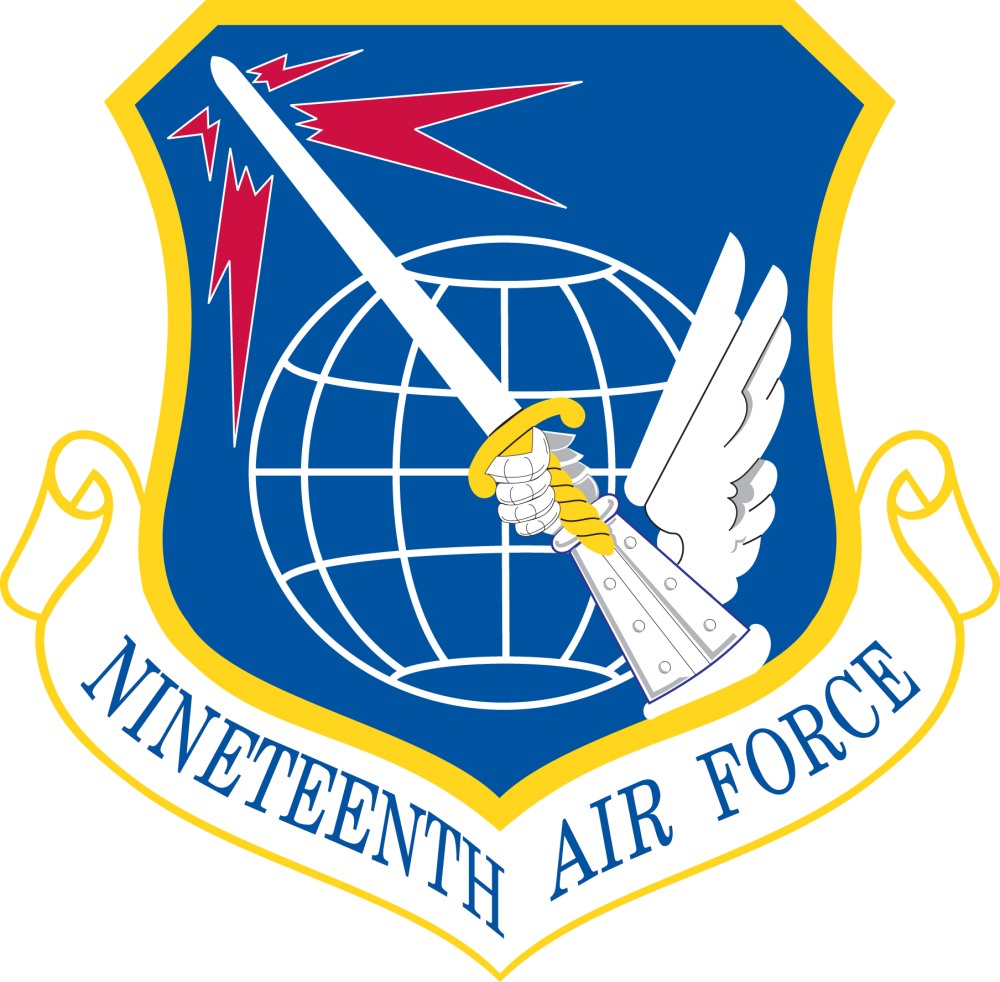
- Shield of the Nineteenth Air Force
- Active: 1 October 2014 – present 1 July 1993 – 13 July 2012; 1 July 1955 – 2 July 1973 (71 years, 1 month)
- Country: United States of America
- Branch: United States Air Force
- Type: Numbered Air Force
- Role: Provide flying, airmanship and SERE training to Air Force Officers, enlisted Airmen, and cadets
- Part of: Air Education and Training Command
- Headquarters: Randolph Air Force Base, Joint Base San Antonio, Texas, U.S.
- Decorations: Air Force Outstanding Unit Award

Commanders
- Current commander: Maj Gen Gregory Kreuder
- Notable commanders: Maj Gen "Michael A. Keltz". Brig. Gen. Henry Viccellio, 8 July 1955 – June, 1960, July 1963 – June 1964; Major General Mark S. Solo; Maj Gen William E. Bryan Jr.

The Nineteenth Air Force (19 AF) is an active Numbered Air Force of the United States Air Force. During the Cold War it was a component of Tactical Air Command, with a mission of command and control over deployed USAF forces in support of United States foreign policy initiatives. The command was reactivated in 1993 under Air Education and Training Command with a mission of conducting AETC's flying training.

19th Air Force was inactivated on 9 July 2012 as a cost-cutting measure by the Secretary of the Air Force, but was reactivated on 1 October 2014 when it was determined that the cost-cutting measures did not reap the savings expected. AETC commander General Robin Rand directed the reactivation to consolidate the management of the AETC flying mission again under a Numbered Air Force instead of the AETC Headquarters.

== History ==
=== Cold War ===
==== Origins ====
In the aftermath of the Korean War in 1953, the United States Air Force began to institutionalize a quick response force to deploy personnel, aircraft and equipment to bases with minimal facilities and to develop an air refueling capacity for its fighter aircraft.

From this initiatives, Tactical Air Command (TAC) developed the Composite Air Strike Force (CASF), a small tactical air force composed of a command element and of fighter, reconnaissance, tanker, troop carrier, and communications support units. While it could fight, if necessary, the principal function of the CASF was to deter Communist aggression in such areas as the Middle East or Latin America, beyond the reach of American forces already stationed overseas. Its primary characteristic was fast reaction, and it would be as self-sufficient as possible. Each of its elements would prepare and store flyaway kits of spare parts and supplies, and each of its members would have specific deployment tasks assigned. Upon arrival in-theater, the unit would be able to sustain operations for 30 days on minimum logistics support, with the addition of required food, fuel, and munitions. Air-to-air refueling not only made rapid response possible, it enabled the various elements of the CASF to maintain themselves economically on their home bases until the need to deploy arose. Once the CASF concept was fully implemented and tested by the late 1950s, the first strike elements of a CASF could arrive in the Middle East within 16 hours of notification, with the total force in place and ready for operations in 48 hours. In the Far East the lead elements would arrive within 36 hours, with the full force in operational status within 72 hours.

On 8 July 1955, under the command of Brig. Gen. Henry Viccellio, TAC activated the command element of the CASF, the Nineteenth Air Force.

==== Structure ====
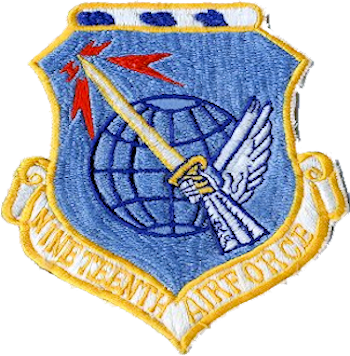
Nineteenth Air Force patch from the 1960s

The headquarters of the Nineteenth Air Force was considered one of the most unusual HQs the U.S. Air Force created at the time. It had no permanently assigned aircraft or combat units. Nor did it have, since it was an operational headquarters only, any units or bases to supervise, train, or inspect. When not deployed, the Nineteenth had a close working relationship with the Ninth Air Force, which supported its administrative functions with many of its own people. These circumstances allowed the Nineteenth to limit its staff to approximately 85 military and 6 civilian personnel.

The mission of Nineteenth Air Force was to prepare contingency plans for and to command short-notice deployments of the CASF anywhere in the world. It required each individual member to be ready for instant departure from the United States, and its staff sections maintained 30-day flyaway kits prepared for shipment. The Nineteenth worked closely with U.S. Army contingency units, and at one point, one-third of its staff was jump-qualified, able to parachute in with U.S. Army airborne troops. In the event of a crisis, the Nineteenth (working from a prepared plan which designated specific units, travel routes, en route support, and timing) would take command of the deploying CASF and serve as part of a joint task force, as a senior air command, or as a component command. At first glance the Nineteenth had a normal headquarters organization with major sections for planning, operations, and logistics. However, these sections had an important secondary function: each served as the lead command element for various geographical contingencies.

The plans section would lead Europe and Middle Eastern deployments; the operations section would lead those to the Pacific; and the logistics section would lead deployments to Latin America, the Caribbean, and Africa. This unique arrangement allowed for continuity of planning and expertise and helped overcome some of the disadvantages inherent in the U.S. armed forces policy of churning personnel through different assignments every three or so years. Within the service, the Nineteenth soon earned its nickname: The Suitcase Air Force.

In keeping with its mission of deterrence, a CASF, in theory, consisted of three task forces, each of which could vary in size and composition, according to its assigned task.

- The first task force had only a limited combat capability and consisted of a show-the-flag or a good-will package. It could fulfill the role of gunboat diplomacy. A force such as this went to Turkey, Iran, and Pakistan (Operation Quick Span) in February 1960.
- The second task force consisted of the basic CASF combat element and would serve as the initial force for a small war. TAC kept the units of the second task force on a progressive 24-hour alert system and planned for the first portion to move within four hours of alert and the entire force to deploy in 24 hours.
- The third task force, composed of additional fighter squadrons, would augment the second if the situation required an expanded force.

==== 1958 Lebanon Crisis ====
On 15 July 1958, President Dwight Eisenhower, acting at the request of the Lebanese government, ordered the U.S. Marine Corps (USMC) into Beirut, Lebanon to help preserve that small country from a wave of popular discontent that was sweeping the Middle East, toppling monarchies in Syria and Iraq and replacing them with military regimes hostile to United States interests.

To support the Marines, the National Command Authorities (NCA) alerted the CASF. Under the command of Maj. Gen. Henry Viccellio, within three hours, B-57 Canberra tactical bombers of the 345th Bombardment Wing, Langley AFB, left for the only friendly major operating airfield in the region, Adana Air Base, Turkey, fifteen minutes' flight time from Beirut. In another three hours, TAC KB–50J Superfortress tankers from the 427th Air Refueling Squadron left Langley AFB to refuel F-100 Super Sabre fighters from the 354th Tactical Fighter Wing departing Myrtle Beach Air Force Base, South Carolina, while RF-101 Voodoos and RB-66 Destroyers from the 363d Tactical Reconnaissance Wing left Shaw AFB, South Carolina. Sixty C–130 Hercules ferried support personnel, spare parts, and equipment. Thirteen hours and 6,700 miles after the initial alert, the F–100s were taxiing to alert ramps at Adana. All deployed aircraft came from the Ninth Air Force. Within two days an underutilized Turkish Air Force gunnery base had become an American air center, with an operations center manned by Nineteenth Air Force personnel (flown in on a single C–130) and integrated with USN, USMC, and U.S. Army forces in the Middle East.

==== 1958 Taiwan Straits Crisis ====
Because the entire Nineteenth Air Force headquarters had deployed to Lebanon, TAC ordered its Twelfth Air Force to form another command element similar to that of the Nineteenth, should another emergency arise. Given the upsurge in tension between the Communist Chinese government on the Asian mainland and the Nationalist Chinese regime on Taiwan, the new command element focused its planning on the Far East. The People's Republic of China had announced its intention to reincorporate a series of small Nationalist-held islands within artillery range of the mainland, in particular the islands of Quemoy and Matsu. During the summer of 1958, the magnitude and duration of the Communists' bombardments increased dramatically.

The United States responded by supplying the Nationalists with tanks and new heavy and longer-ranged artillery as well as by beefing up its own forces in the region. TAC placed on alert a squadron of F–100s; transport aircraft loaded with supplies, parts, and equipment; and a communications and control squadron. It also began to "lean forward", sending tankers, weathermen, maintenance crews, and control units to islands on the air route between California and Thirteenth Air Force headquarters at Clark AB in the Philippine Islands.

Late on 29 August 1958, the second CASF received the "go" order. F–100s from the 31st Tactical Fighter Wing, George Air Force Base carrying AIM-9 Sidewinder air-to-air missiles took off on 30 August and spent that night at Hickam AFB, Hawaii. The next night they were at Andersen AFB, Guam, where Typhoon Lola delayed their movement for 24 hours. On 2 September, they landed at Clark AB, after a flight of 9,500 miles and an elapsed time of 96 hours. RF–101s from the 432d Tactical Reconnaissance Wing Shaw AFB arrived soon after, and C–130s formed an airlift bridge carrying support personnel, equipment, tools, and workstands to Clark. On 5 and 6 September, the CASF, with much assistance from both the Thirteenth Air Force and the Fifth Air Force in Japan, flew to Chia-ti AB, a Nationalist air base on Taiwan where they came under the control of a joint operations center established the previous day by CASF personnel. Nine days later, a squadron of F-104 Starfighters of the 83d Fighter-Interceptor Squadron, Hamilton AFB, California, occupied another Nationalist air base (Taoyuan Air Base). Two more fighter squadrons at Kadena AB, and a B-57 Canberra squadron at Naha AB, Okinawa backed up this force. The mission of all units was to defend the straits between Formosa and the mainland.

==== 1962 Cuban Missile Crisis ====
In mid-October 1962, the Nineteenth moved from its home base, Seymour Johnson AFB, North Carolina, to Homestead AFB, Florida. Once at Homestead, the Nineteenth spearheaded the deployment of TAC units at the beginning of the Cuban Missile Crisis. The Nineteenth's commander headed the main air operations center, the Air Force Atlantic Advanced Operational Nucleus (AFLANT ADVON), which activated shortly after President Kennedy's speech declaring a quarantine of Soviet missile shipments into Cuba. Augmented by airmen and officers from other TAC air forces, AFLANT ADVON soon controlled nearly 1,000 aircraft and 7,000 men and women. The Nineteenth returned to North Carolina in December 1962 when the crisis ended.

==== Other missions ====
In September 1962, when racial tension over the integration of the state university in Oxford, Mississippi, caused the federal government to send in troops, personnel of the Nineteenth coordinated airlift activities.

In 1963 Nineteenth Air Force conducted two show-the-flag exercises. The first went to Saudi Arabia in early May. There, the Nineteenth helped to train Saudi pilots and supervised a tactical demonstration at Jidda International Airport for 30,000 spectators that included Crown Prince Faisal, the Prime Minister, the Saudi Foreign Minister, and other royalty and officials.

The second went to India in October. There, in Exercise Shiksha (Sanskrit for training), the Nineteenth, in cooperation with the British and Australian Royal Air Forces, helped to improve Indian Air Force air defense capabilities and provide other tactical training. This effort was partially in response to the earlier division-sized Sino-Indian conflict. Throughout its existence, the Nineteenth also participated in numerous joint exercises within the United States as well as in practice alerts.

For practical purposes, the Vietnam War ended the work of the Nineteenth Air Force, as that conflict absorbed a large proportion of the USAF's assets not directly dedicated to the nuclear deterrent and consequently lessened the nation's ability to intervene in other crisis areas. At the beginning of the Vietnam War, a CASF deployed in response to the Tonkin Gulf incidents, and in 1968 the last CASF deployment came in support of American forces in the Republic of Korea during the USS Pueblo incident.

Nineteenth Air Force was inactivated in July 1973, as part of the economies enacted after the end of the Vietnam War.

On 4 August 1998, the Chief of Staff of the Air Force, General Michael E. Ryan, and the Acting Secretary of the Air Force, F. Whitten Peters, announced a major change in the structure of the Air Force. They proposed to divide the USAF's combat strength and the elements directly supporting it into ten Air Expeditionary Forces (AEFs). The concept was described by military historian Richard G. Davis as "a major step in recasting the operations, outlook, and culture of the USAF."

=== Air Education and Training Command ===
As a part of the realignment and re-organization of the Air Force after the end of the Cold War, Nineteenth Air Force was re-activated on 1 July 1993 as part of the new Air Education and Training Command (AETC). It was assigned to Randolph AFB, Texas with a mission of conducting AETC's flying training.

Air Force pilot candidates began with introductory flight training (IFT). In IFT, civilian instructors provided 50 hours of flight instruction to pilot candidates who completed requirements for a private pilot license. Upon graduation, pilot candidates then attended either Euro-NATO joint jet pilot training (ENJJPT) or joint specialized undergraduate pilot training (JSUPT).

- ENJJPT is located at Sheppard AFB, Texas. The entire course lasts about 54 weeks. Students learn with, and are taught by, USAF officers and officers from various air forces of our European allies. Student pilots first fly the T-6 Texan II mastering contact, instrument, low-level and formation flying. Next, they train on the supersonic T-38 Talon and continue building the skills necessary to become a fighter pilot.
- JSUPT students accomplish primary training in the T-6 Texan II at one of three Air Force bases – Columbus AFB, Mississippi, Laughlin AFB, Texas, or Vance AFB, Oklahoma; or in the T-34C Turbomentor at Naval Air Station Whiting Field, Florida. Joint training is conducted at Vance AFB, and NAS Whiting Field for students from the Air Force and Navy. During the primary phase of JSUPT, students learn basic flight skills common to all military pilots.
- Prospective airlift and tanker pilots are assigned to the airlift/tanker track and train in the T-1 Jayhawk at Columbus AFB, Laughlin AFB, or Vance AFB. Student pilots headed for bomber or fighter assignments are assigned to the bomber/fighter track and train in the T-38 Talon at Columbus, Laughlin or Vance. Students assigned to the multi-engine turboprop track fly the T-44 Pegasus turboprop trainers at NAS Corpus Christi, Texas, and will eventually fly the C-130 Hercules.
- Those students selected to fly helicopters are assigned to the helicopter track and fly the UH-1 Huey at Fort Novosel, Alabama.

Nineteenth Air Force also provided follow-on training for most Air Force pilots in their assigned aircraft. Pilots assigned to fighter aircraft complete the introduction to fighter fundamentals course at Randolph AFB or Sheppard AFB, Texas, or Columbus AFB, Mississippi, flying the AT-38B Talon, and then move on to train in either the F-15 Eagle at Kingsley Field ANGB, Oregon, or the F-16 Fighting Falcon at Luke AFB, Arizona.

Altus AFB, Oklahoma hosts training for pilots and enlisted aircrew assigned to KC-135 Stratotanker, C-17 Globemaster III, and KC-46 Pegasus aircraft.

Aircrews assigned to fly the C-130 train at Little Rock AFB, AR

Pilots assigned to fly MC-130 Combat Talon, HC-130 Hercules, CV-22 Osprey, UH-1N, MH-53 Pave Low or HH-60 Pave Hawk helicopters receive their training at Kirtland AFB, New Mexico.

Keesler AFB, Mississippi, provides training for pilots assigned to the C-21 Learjet

The Army at Fort Novosel, provides training in the C-12 Huron.

In addition to pilot training, Nineteenth Air Force provides joint specialized undergraduate navigator training. JSUNT is conducted at Randolph AFB and NAS Pensacola, Florida, and provides training for Air Force, Navy and Marine student navigators. Students at Randolph complete training in the T-43 Bobcat and move to follow-on assignments in transport and tanker aircraft such as the C-130 and KC-135.

Students at NAS Pensacola, complete primary and intermediate training in the T-34C and T-1 aircraft, and then enter the one of two tracks in the next phase. Students in the strike track will serve as navigators in the B-52 Stratofortress or as weapon systems officers in the B-1B Lancer. Navigators assigned to the B-1B attend a special training program at Randolph. Students in the strike/fighter track will receive follow-on assignments in the F-15E Strike Eagle as weapon systems officers and attend special training in the IFF course.

Nineteenth Air Force also provided enlisted aircrew training for a wide variety of aircrew specialties including flight engineers, air-to-air refueling boom operators, loadmasters, aerial gunners, airborne communications specialists and weapons directors. Flight engineers and boom operators train at Altus AFB, loadmasters train at Sheppard AFB, helicopter flight engineers and aerial gunners train at Kirtland AFB, airborne communications specialists train at Keesler AFB, and Air Battle Managers train at Tyndall AFB.

As a cost-cutting measure, Nineteenth Air Force was inactivated on 9 July 2012. An inactivation ceremony was held for the 19th Air Force at Joint Base San Antonio, Texas.

=== Lineage ===
- Established as Nineteenth Air Force on 1 July 1955

Activated on 8 July 1955
Inactivated on 2 July 1973

- Re-activated on 1 July 1993

Inactivated on 13 July 2012

- Re-activated on 1 October 2014

=== Assignments ===
- Tactical Air Command*, 8 July 1955 – 2 July 1973

Attached to: Ninth Air Force, 8 July 1955 – 30 June 1957

- Air Education and Training Command, 8 June 1993 – 9 July 2012, 1 October 2014–

Note: In its first two years, Nineteenth Air Force was directly attached to Ninth Air Force. On 1 July 1957 it moved to the direct control of TAC headquarters but it maintained its working relationship with the Ninth Air Force, whose support enabled the Nineteenth to retain its small footprint

=== Stations ===
- Foster AFB, Texas, 8 July 1955
- Seymour Johnson AFB, North Carolina, 1 September 1958 – 2 July 1973
- Randolph AFB, Texas, 8 June 1993 – 9 July 2012, 1 October 2014 – Present

=== AETC Components ===
- 12th Flying Training Wing, Randolph AFB, TX
- 14th Flying Training Wing, Columbus AFB, MS
- 47th Flying Training Wing, Laughlin AFB, TX
- 54th Fighter Group, Holloman AFB, NM
- 58th Special Operations Wing, Kirtland AFB, NM
- 71st Flying Training Wing, Vance AFB, OK
- 80th Flying Training Wing, Sheppard AFB, TX
- 97th Air Mobility Wing, Altus AFB, Ok
- 314th Airlift Wing, Little Rock AFB, AR
- 336th Training Group, Fairchild AFB, WA
- 479th Flying Training Group, NAS Pensacola, FL

== List of commanders ==
No.	Commander		Term		
No.	Portrait	Name	Took office	Left office	Term length
1	Michael A. Keltz	Major General; Michael A. Keltz	1 October 2014	23 June 2015	265 days
2	James Hecker	Major General; James Hecker	23 June 2015	28 March 2017	1 year, 278 days
3	Patrick J. Doherty	Major General; Patrick J. Doherty	28 March 2017	13 June 2019	2 years, 77 days
4	Craig D. Wills	Major General; Craig D. Wills	13 June 2019	19 August 2022	3 years, 67 days
5	Phillip A. Stewart	Major General; Phillip A. Stewart	19 August 2022	10 May 2023	264 days
-	Christopher R. Amrhein	Brigadier General; Christopher R. Amrhein; Acting	10 May 2023	5 June 2023	26 days
6	Clark Quinn	Major General; Clark Quinn	5 June 2023	8 July 2024	1 year, 33 days
7	Gregory Kreuder	Major General; Gregory Kreuder	8 July 2024	Incumbent	2 years, 35 days
