= Dirk D. Smith =

U.S. Air Force general

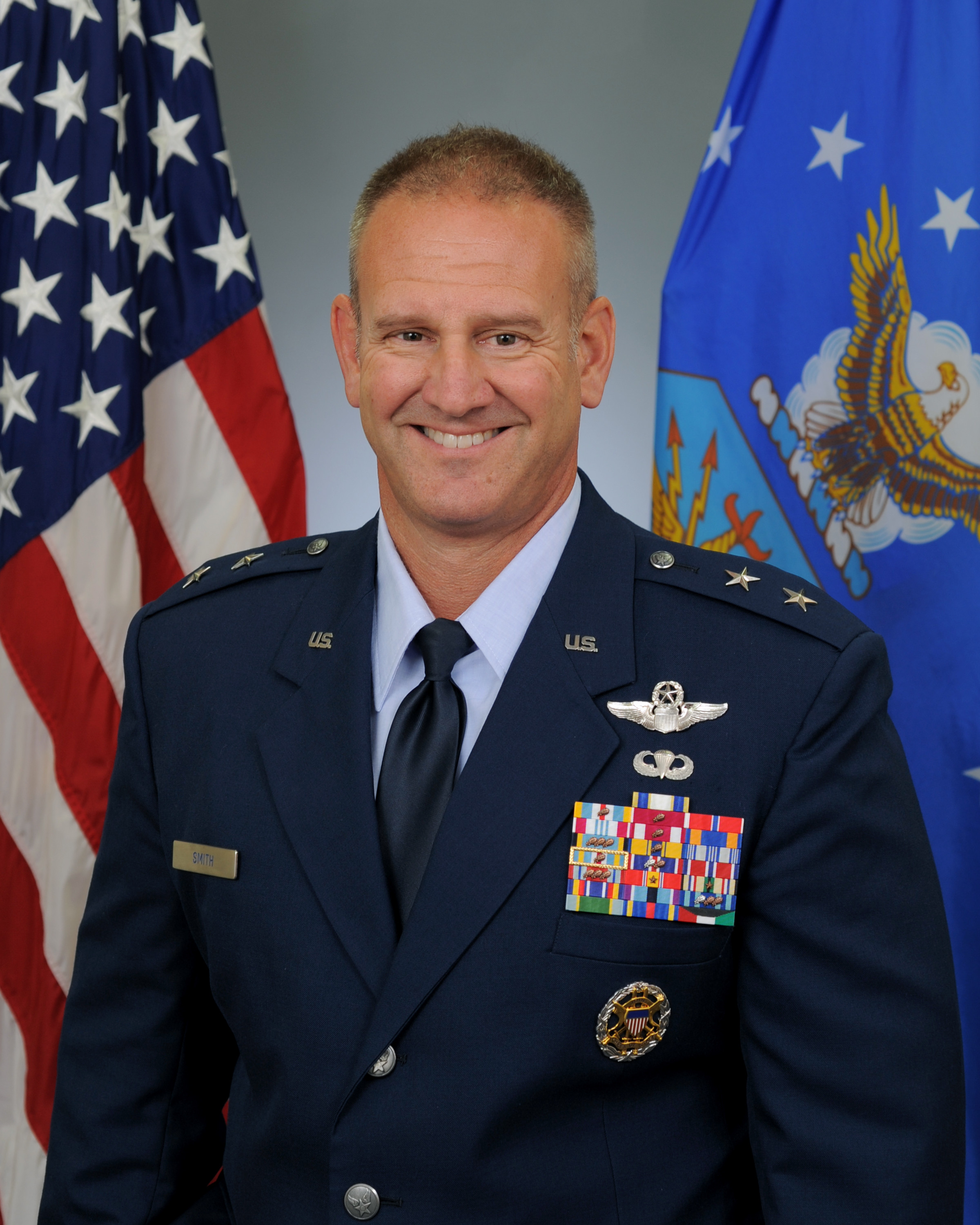
- Military career
- Allegiance: United States
- Branch: United States Air Force
- Service years: 1988-2019 (38 years)
- Rank: Major General
- Commands: 9th Air Expeditionary Task Force-Levant; 3rd Wing; 609th Air and Space Operations Center; 1st Operations Group; 94th Fighter Squadron
- Awards: Air Force Distinguished Service Medal; Defense Superior Service Medal; Legion of Merit (2)

Dirk D. Smith is a retired United States Air Force major general who served as the Vice Director for Joint Force Development of the Joint Staff. Previously, he was the Deputy Commander for Operations and Intelligence of the Combined Joint Task Force.

Military offices
Preceded by John K. McMullen	Commander of the 3rd Wing; 2011–2013	Succeeded by David S. Nahom
Preceded by ???	Deputy Director for Operations of the United States Indo-Pacific Command; 2013–2015	Succeeded by Michael Minihan
Preceded by ???	Director of Air and Cyberspace Operations of the Pacific Air Forces; 2015–2017	Succeeded by Stephen C. Williams
Preceded by Scott Kindsvater	Deputy Commander for Operations and Intelligence of the Combined Joint Task Force; 2017–2018	Succeeded by Chad Franks
Preceded by Thomas H. Deale	Vice Director for Joint Force Development of the Joint Staff; 2018–2019	Succeeded by David R. Iverson
