= David Moeller =

Welsh cricketer (1941–2004)

David Moeller (2 March 1941 – 18 November 2004) was a Welsh first-class cricketer active 1961 who played for Oxford University. He was born in Marshfield, Monmouthshire and died in Oxford. He appeared in one first-class match.
