= Phillip A. Stewart =

U.S. Air Force general

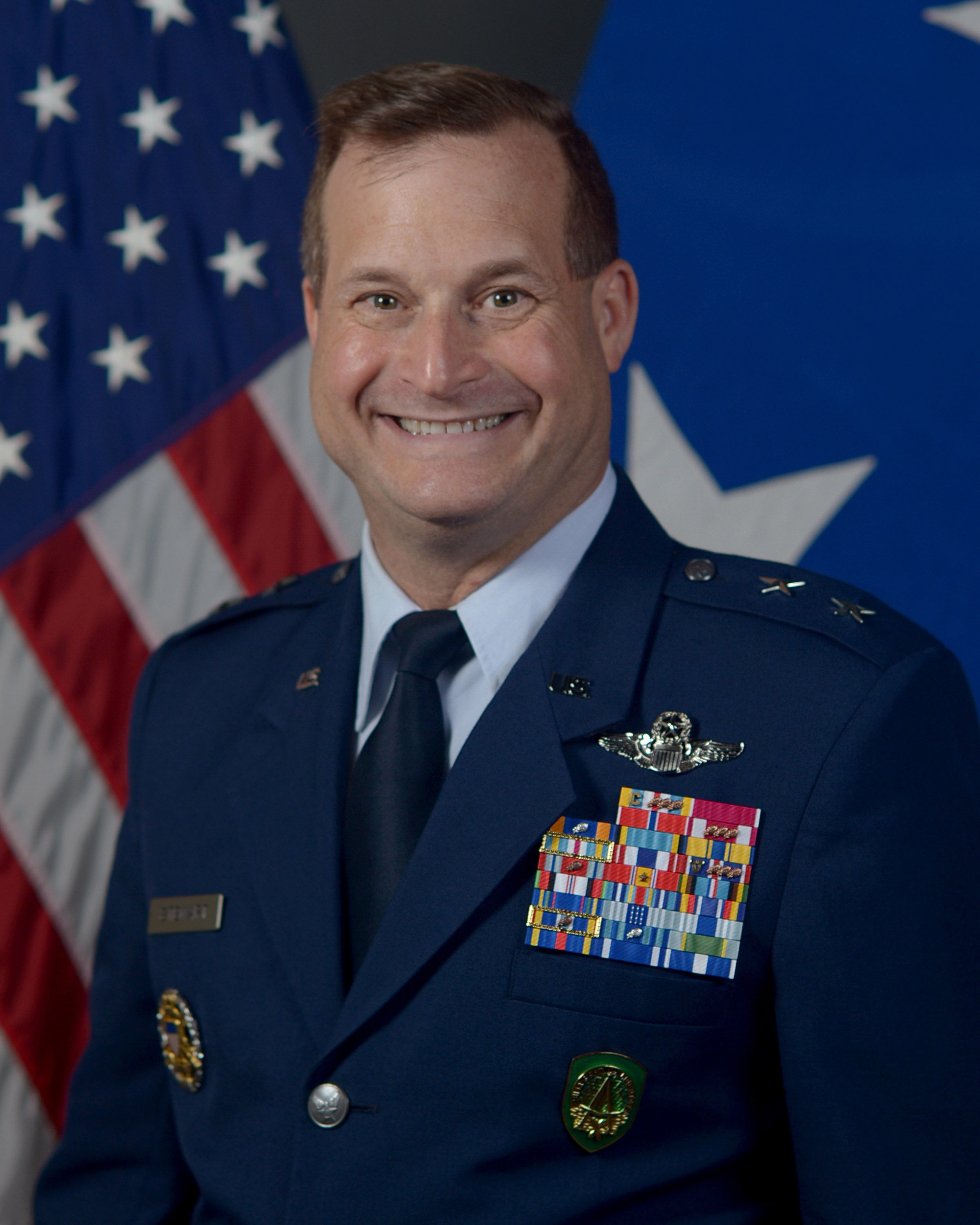
- Official portrait, 2022
- Military career
- Allegiance: United States
- Branch: United States Air Force
- Service years: 1992–2024
- Rank: Brigadier general, formerly Major General
- Commands: Nineteenth Air Force; NATO Alliance Ground Surveillance Force; 438th Air Expeditionary Wing; 9th Reconnaissance Wing; 362nd Expeditionary Reconnaissance Squadron
- Conflicts: War in Afghanistan
- Awards: Defense Superior Service Medal (4); Legion of Merit; Bronze Star Medal

Phillip A. Stewart is a former United States Air Force major general who served as the commander of the Nineteenth Air Force from 2022 to 2023. He previously served as the Deputy Chief of Staff for Strategic Employment of the Supreme Headquarters Allied Powers Europe from 2020 to 2022.

On May 9, 2023, Stewart was relieved from command by Air Education and Training Command Commander Brian S. Robinson "due to a loss of confidence in his ability to lead, related to alleged misconduct which is currently under investigation.". In December 2023, he was charged for sexually assaulting a subordinate officer. In June 2024, the sexual assault charges were dropped, but he is still charged with “conduct unbecoming an officer for allegedly inviting a subordinate to spend the night with him” and for “allegedly controlling an aircraft within 12 hours after consuming alcohol”. Steward is the first general in the history of the US armed forces to be tried on these charges by a (military) jury rather than a single judge.

In 2025 he was convicted of adultery and dereliction of duty and demoted to the rank of Brigadier general.

Military offices
Preceded by David W. Hicks	Commander of the 438th Air Expeditionary Wing; 2017–2018	Succeeded by Joel L. Carey
Preceded by Pedro Renn	Commanding General of the NATO Alliance Ground Surveillance Force; 2018–2020	Succeeded by Houston Cantwell
Preceded by Barre Seguin	Deputy Chief of Staff for Strategic Employment of the Supreme Headquarters Allied Powers Europe; 2020–2022	Succeeded by Matthew J. Van Wagenen
Preceded by Craig D. Wills	Commander of the Nineteenth Air Force; 2022–2023	Succeeded by Christopher R. Amrhein; Acting
