= James N. Post III =

American military officer

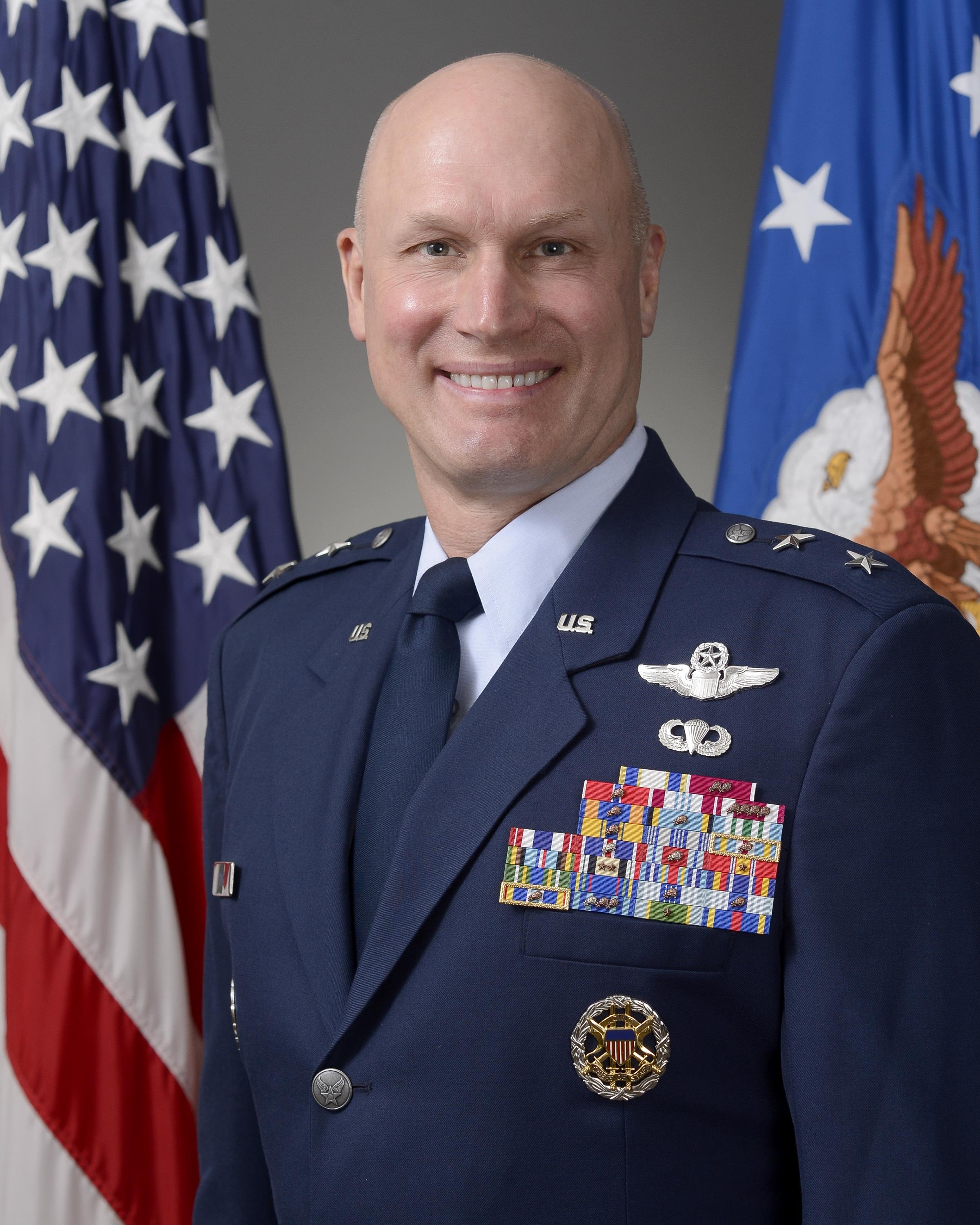
- Military career
- Allegiance: United States
- Branch: United States Air Force
- Service years: 1983–2016
- Rank: Major General
- Nickname: Bull
- Conflicts: Operation Iraqi Freedom
- Awards: Distinguished Service Medal; Legion of Merit; Bronze Star Medal (2); Defense Meritorious Service Medal; Meritorious Service Medal (5); Air Medal (2); Aerial Achievement Medal (2); Combat Readiness Medal (6)

Major General James Nelson Post III is a former United States Air Force officer who served as Director of the United States Air Forces Central Command's Air and Space Operations Center, and Director and Vice Commander of the Air Combat Command. A command pilot with over 4,850 flying hours, he led combat missions in support of Operations Northern Watch, Operation Southern Watch and Operation Iraqi Freedom. He was relieved of his command in April 2015 for discouraging personnel under his command from communicating with the United States Congress.

== Biography ==
Raised in Lincoln Park, New Jersey, he graduated in 1978 from Boonton High School. Post graduated from the United States Air Force Academy with a Bachelor of Science degree in June 1983. He undertook pilot training at Laughlin Air Force Base in Texas from June 1983 to June 1984, and lead-in fighter training at Holloman Air Force Base in New Mexico from July to September 1984. From October 1984 to June 1985 he learned to fly the F-4D Phantom II at Homestead Air Force Base in Florida with the 308th Fighter Squadron. He was then posted to Germany, where he served with the 23d Fighter Squadron, flying the F-4E Phantom II from Spangdahlem Air Base.

Returning to the United States, Post became an F-16 Falcon evaluation pilot with the 62nd and 63rd Fighter Squadrons at MacDill Air Force Base in Florida. This was the beginning of a long association with the F-16, which would eventually see him complete over 4,000 hours flight time in the aircraft when he flew his 2,565th sortie in March 2011. In 1990, he was a distinguished graduate of the Squadron Officer School at Maxwell Air Force Base in Alabama. He then earned a Master of Public Administration degree from Troy University in 1991, and completed the Fighter Weapons Instructor Course at the Fighter Weapons School at Nellis Air Force Base in Nevada in December 1992. From January 1993 until January 1994, he was an F-16 Instructor and Evaluation Pilot and the Weapons Officer and Flight Commander of the 35th Fighter Squadron, which was based at Kunsan Air Base in South Korea. Between February 1994 and June 1996, he was an F-16 Instructor and Evaluation Pilot, Chief of Standardization and Evaluation, and wing weapons officer, of the 35th Fighter Wing, at Misawa Air Base in Japan. He won the Air Force's Anthony C. Shine Award for Fighter Pilot of the Year in 1996.

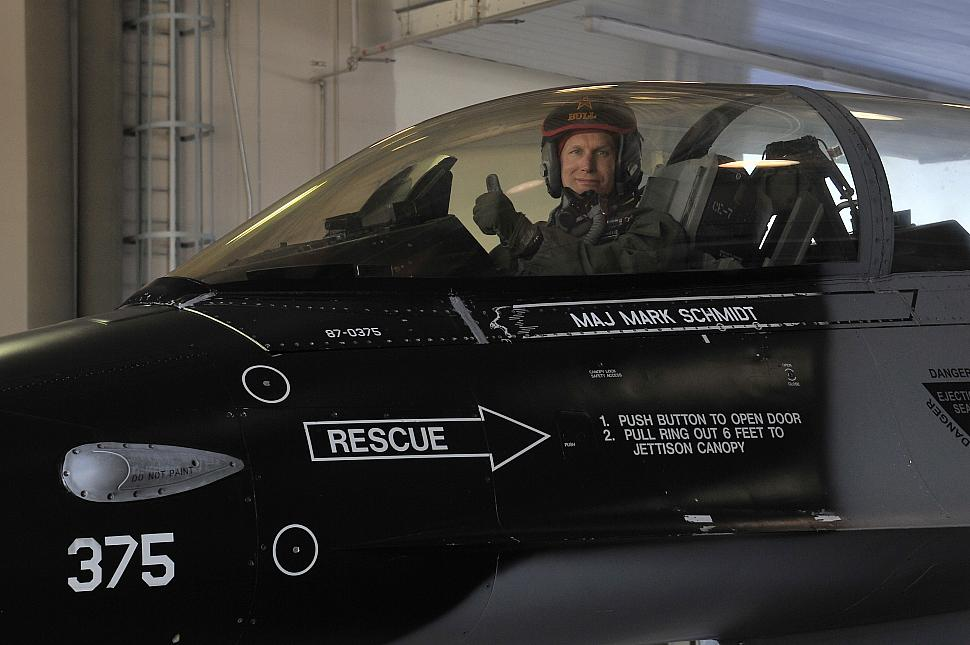
Post gives a thumbs up after landing on 3 March 2011, completing his 2565th sortie and 4,000 flying hours in an F-16

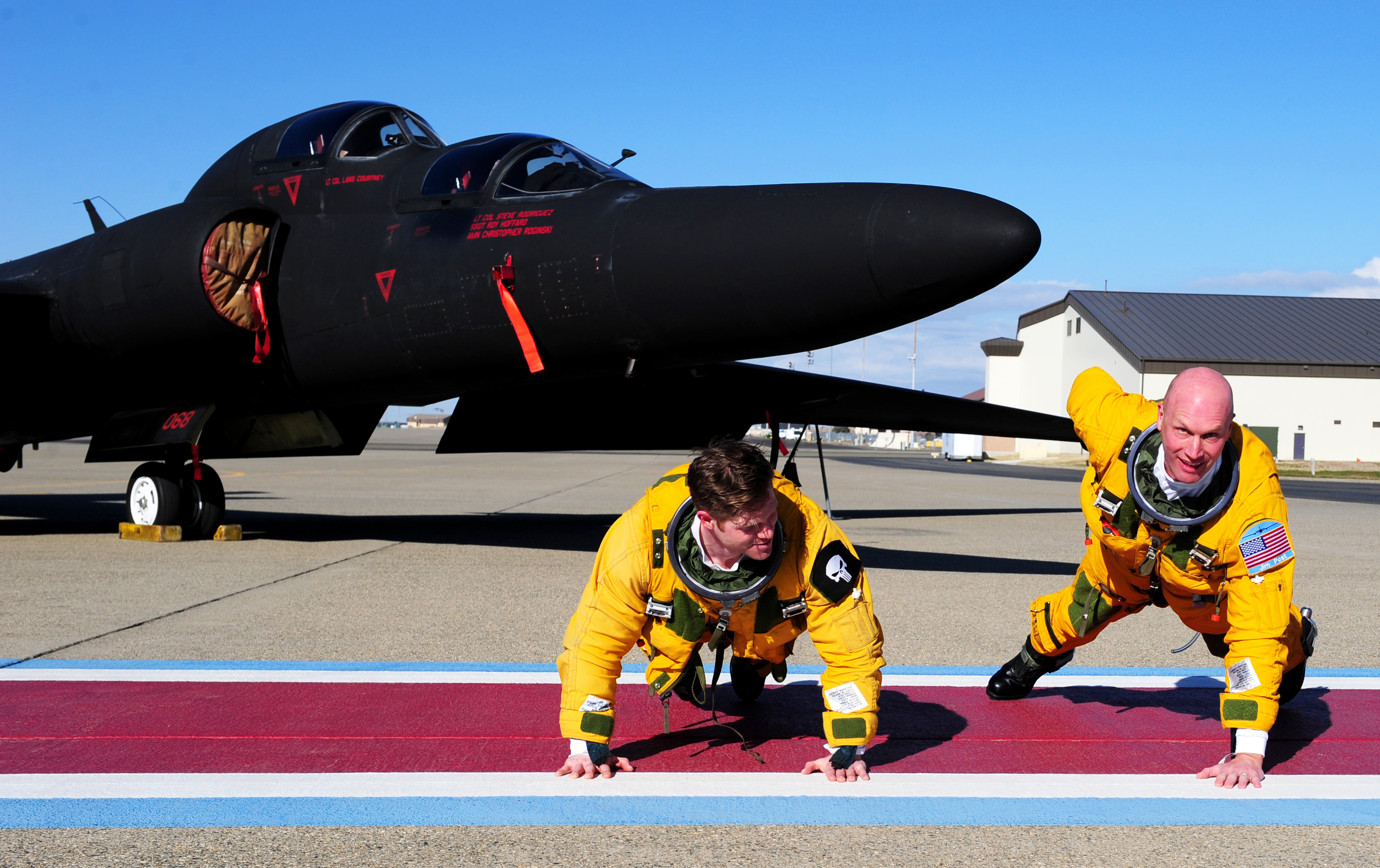
Post demonstrates a one armed push-up alongside Major Geoffrey, 1st Reconnaissance Squadron U-2 pilot, 3 December 2013, at Beale Air Force Base California after Post and Geoffrey completed a sortie aboard a TU-2S

From July 1996 to May 1997, Post was a student at the Army Command and General Staff College at Fort Leavenworth, Kansas. He was then posted to The Pentagon in Washington, DC, as Operations Officer, Western Hemisphere, Operations Directorate (J3) in June 1997. He graduated from the Armed Forces Staff College in 1998. In July and August 1999, completed the F-16 transition course at Luke Air Force Base in Arizona. He was an F-16 Evaluation Pilot with the 77th Fighter Squadron, Operations Officer with the 79th Fighter Squadron, and then commander of the 55th Fighter Squadron, all at Shaw Air Force Base in South Carolina. From July 2002 to June 2003, he was a student at the Air War College at Maxwell Air Force Base, earning a Master of Strategic Studies degree. He was Senior Deputy Commander of the 56th Operations Group at Luke Air Force Base from July 2003 to March 2004, and Vice Commander of the 388th Fighter Wing at Hill Air Force Base in Utah from April 2004 to July 2006. He was in charge of Standardization and Evaluation with the Twelfth Air Force at Davis-Monthan Air Force Base in Arizona from August 2006 to January 2007. He commanded the 20th Fighter Wing at Shaw Air Force Base from February 2007 to October 2008, and then the 609th Air and Space Operations Center at Al Udeid Air Base in Qatar in support of Operation Iraqi Freedom. He flew 280 combat sorties. From August 2009 until January 2010, he was Director of Plans and Requirements at Headquarters, Twelfth Air Force. From February 2010 to August 2012, he was commander of the 354th Fighter Wing at Eielson Air Force Base in Alaska.

== Controversy ==
Post was promoted to the rank of brigadier general on 7 May 2010. From August 2012 until June 2013, he was Deputy Director of Operations, Plans and Policy at Headquarters Pacific Air Forces at Joint Base Pearl Harbor–Hickam in Hawaii. He attended the Capstone Flag Officer Course at the National Defense University at Fort Lesley J. McNair in Washington, D.C., and the Combined Forces Air Component Commander Course, at Maxwell Air Force Base in 2012, the Joint Forces Maritime Component Commander Course at Naval Station Newport in Rhode Island, in 2013 and the Joint Flag Officer War fighter's Course at Maxwell Air Force Base in 2014. From June 2013 until September 2014, he was Director of Operations at Headquarters, Air Combat Command at Joint Base Langley-Eustis in Virginia with the rank of brigadier general from August 2013.

At the Air Force's annual Weapons and Tactics Conference on 10 January 2015, Post responded to a question about the future of the Fairchild Republic A-10 Thunderbolt II. This aircraft had been developed in the 1970s specifically for close air support, and had seen extensive service in conflicts since then. In 2012, the Air Force announced plans to disband five squadrons of A-10s as a cost-saving measure. The plan ran into strong opposition in the United States Congress. The National Defense Authorization Act for Fiscal Year 2014 prohibited the Air Force from spending any money retiring or planning to retire the A-10. Post recalled that in his answer he said:

I believed it was essential for the members in the audience to listen and understand the importance of the Air Force's decision with respect to the future of the A-10. I said that their expertise and commitment was critical to our finding the most effective way to transition to the F-35-how we do Close Air Support, how we do Combat Search and Rescue, and how we might find offsets to accommodate the divestiture of the A-10. I then mentioned that some of the argument over the A-10 seemed to be misinformed, subjective, and in many cases emotional. I said that it was okay to be proud of a weapons system that's done tremendous work in support of troops and friendly forces around the world. I said I could relate with those passionate about their assigned weapon system, but unfortunately fiscal reality wouldn't allow us to do both-continue flying the A-10 while bringing the F-35 to operational capability. I said that the internal (AF) discussion and debate was over, the CSAF and SECAF have been briefed; they've made their decision and passed their recommendation to Congress accordingly. That said, I mentioned that it didn't appear the divestiture of the A-10 was going to happen as early, nor as quickly as the AF recommends. I said It was time to focus and work hard towards doing the best we can with what we know, and not towards undermining senior leaders' decisions, nor towards fulfilling personal preferences and agendas. The majority of the audience appeared to nod in agreement. And finally, I said that for those in uniform to do anything contrary to what the Chief and Secretary have directed would be disloyal, or some might say institutional treason (or words to that effect).

The use of the word "treason" silenced the room. Some listeners took it literally. Post's remarks were reported on the internet. On 13 January, he notified the Chief of Staff of the United States Air Force, General Mark Welsh of what he had said in an email. On 16 January 2015, the Office of the Inspector General, U.S. Department of Defense received an anonymous complaint alleging that Post had made remarks to the effect that communicating with Congress about the capabilities of the A-10 was treason. This was based on an item on the website dodbuzz.com. The matter was referred to the Air Force for investigation on 22 January. Meanwhile, on 21 January, the United States Secretary of the Air Force, Deborah Lee James, received a letter of complaint from Senator John McCain. Restricting communications with members of Congress is an offence under Title 10, United States Code, Section 1034, Protected communications; prohibition of retaliatory personnel actions, and Department of Defense Directive 7050.06, Military Whistleblower Protection. In his report, the Inspector General of the Air Force, Lieutenant General Gregory A. Biscone, found that while Post may not have intended to break the law, and did not actually prevent anyone from speaking to Congress, his words had a chilling effect.

On 9 April 2015, the commander of the Air Combat Command, General Herbert J. Carlisle, relieved Post, and issued him a letter of reprimand. Post's final assignment was as Director of Current Operations in the office of the Deputy Chief of Staff for Operations at Headquarters U.S. Air Force, at The Pentagon. He retired in October 2016.

== Dates of rank ==
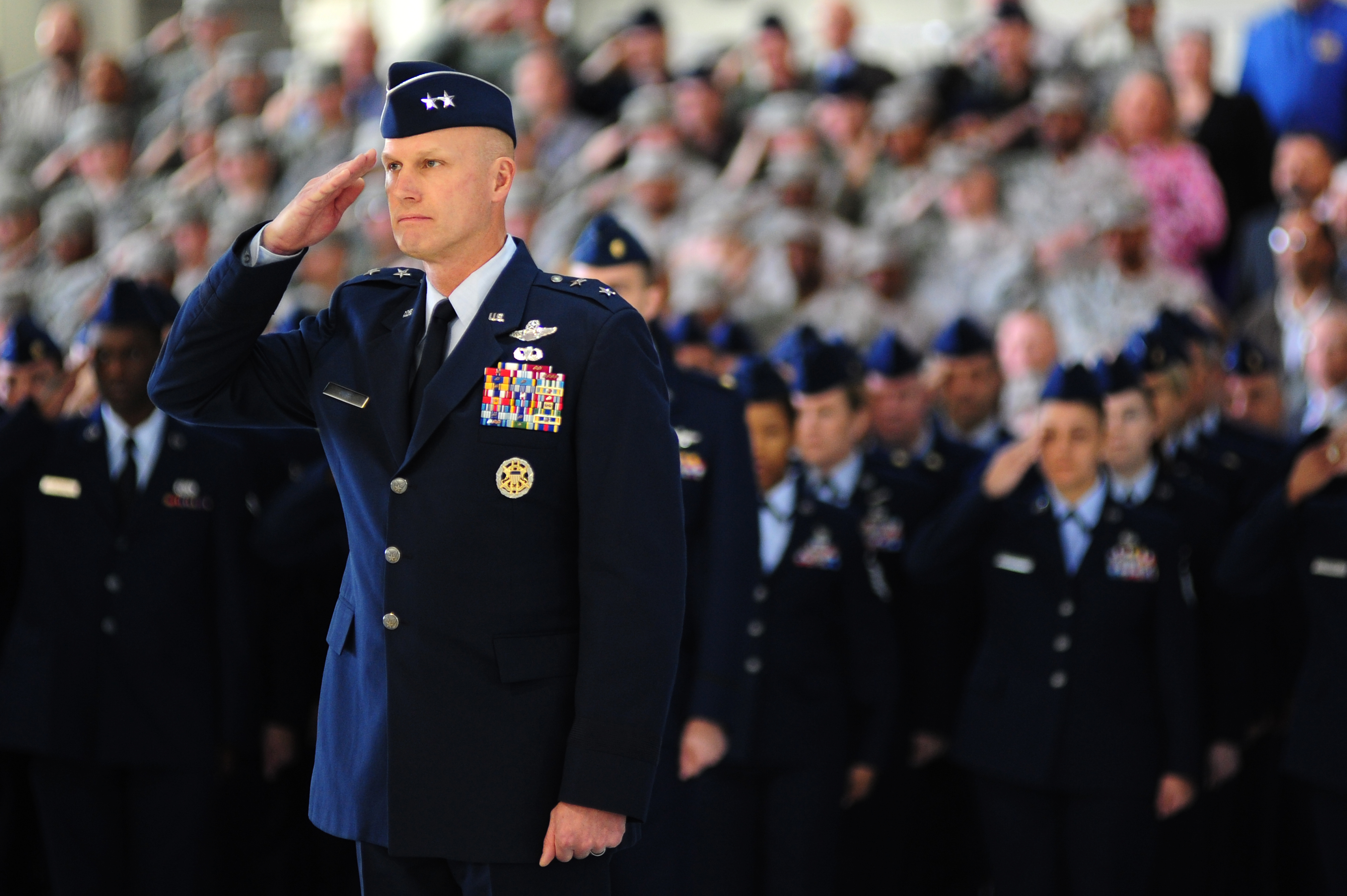
Post salutes during the playing of the National Anthem during the Air Combat Command change of command ceremony at Langley Air Force Base on 4 November 2014

Second Lieutenant, 1 June 1983
First Lieutenant, 1 June 1985
Captain, 1 June 1987
Major, 1 May 1995
Lieutenant Colonel, 1 September 1998
Colonel, 1 June 2004
Brigadier General, 7 May 2010
Major General, 9 August 2013
