= Mark D. Kelly =

United States Air Force general

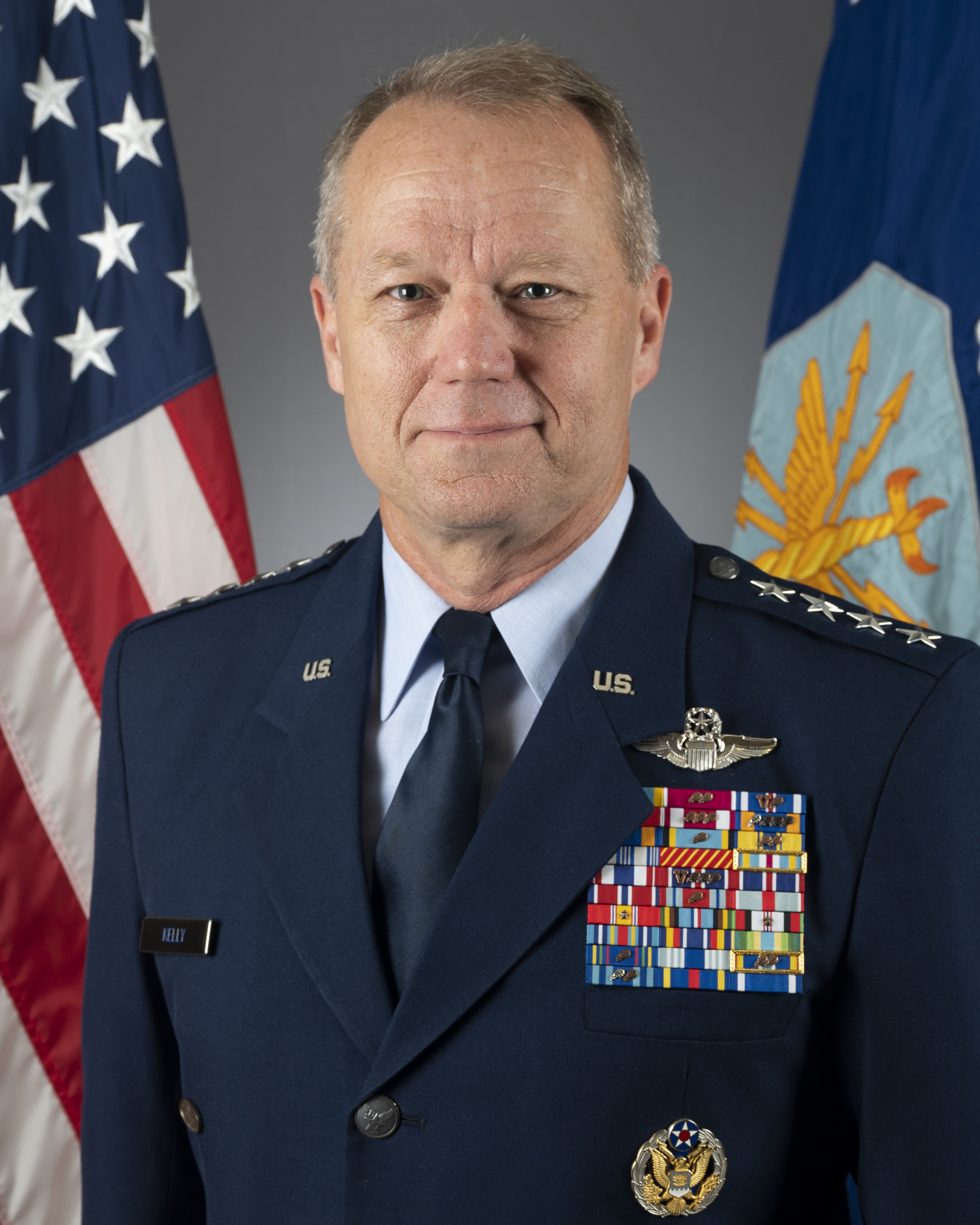
- Official portrait, 2020
- Born: September 19, 1962 (age 64)
- Military career
- Allegiance: United States
- Branch: United States Air Force
- Service years: 1986–2024
- Rank: General
- Commands: Air Combat Command; Twelfth Air Force; Ninth Air Force; 455th Air Expeditionary Wing; 354th Fighter Wing; 4th Fighter Wing; 333rd Fighter Squadron
- Conflicts: War in Afghanistan
- Awards: Defense Superior Service Medal (2); Legion of Merit (3)

Mark Damon Kelly (born September 19, 1962) is a retired general in the United States Air Force who served as the commander of Air Combat Command from 2020 to 2024. He previously served as the deputy chief of staff for operations from August 2018 to August 2020. He is a command pilot with more than 6,000 flying hours. His pilot experience is including 800 combat hours in Tactical Fighter-Aircraft.

== Early life ==
Kelly was commissioned through the Reserve Officers' Training Corps program at Southwest Texas State University in February 1986. Kelly received his commission from the Air Force ROTC program at Southwest Texas State University in 1986. He earned his pilot wings at the Euro-NATO Joint Jet Pilot Training School at Sheppard Air Force Base, Texas.

== Air Force career ==
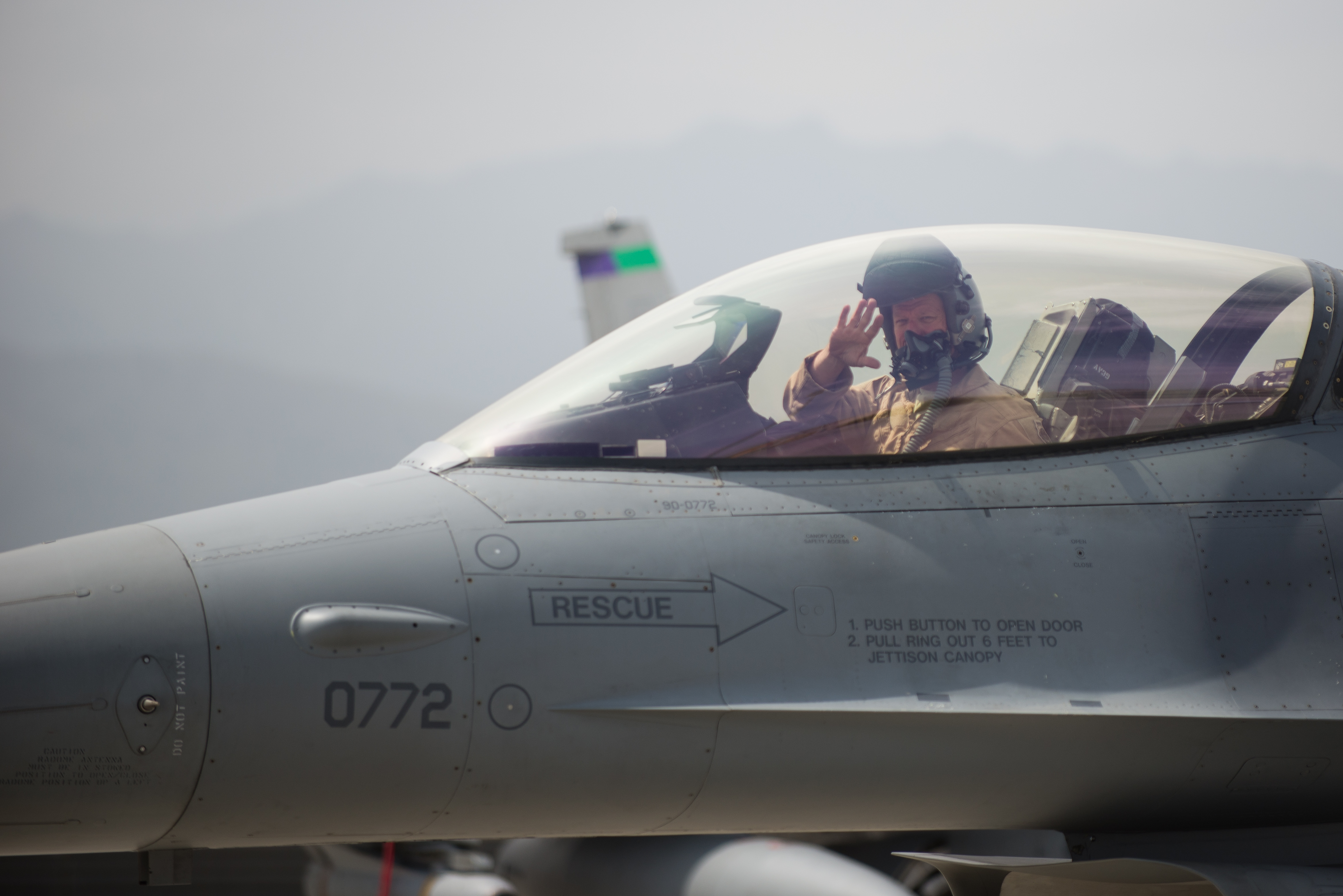
Brigadier General Kelly piloting a Lockheed-Martin F-16 Fighting Falcon during his tenure as commander of 455th Air Expeditionary Wing.

Upon commissioning and earning of his pilot wings, Kelly was first assigned as an instructor pilot with duty as the executive, standardardization and evaluation officer for the 80th Flying Training Wing, also located at Sheppard Air Force Base, specializing in the Cessna T-37 Tweet Training Aircraft. He received his training for piloting the McDonnell Douglas F-15E Strike Eagle from August 1991 to April 1992, under 461st Fighter Squadron at Luke Air Force Base, Arizona.

As a colonel, Kelly served as vice commander of the 366th Fighter Wing at Mountain Home Air Force Base in Idaho from 2007 to 2008. His general officer assignments include command of the 354th Fighter Wing from 2012 to 2014, wing commander of the 455th Air Expeditionary Wing in 2014, and commander of the Ninth Air Force at Shaw Air Force Base in South Carolina from July 31, 2015, to May 17, 2016.

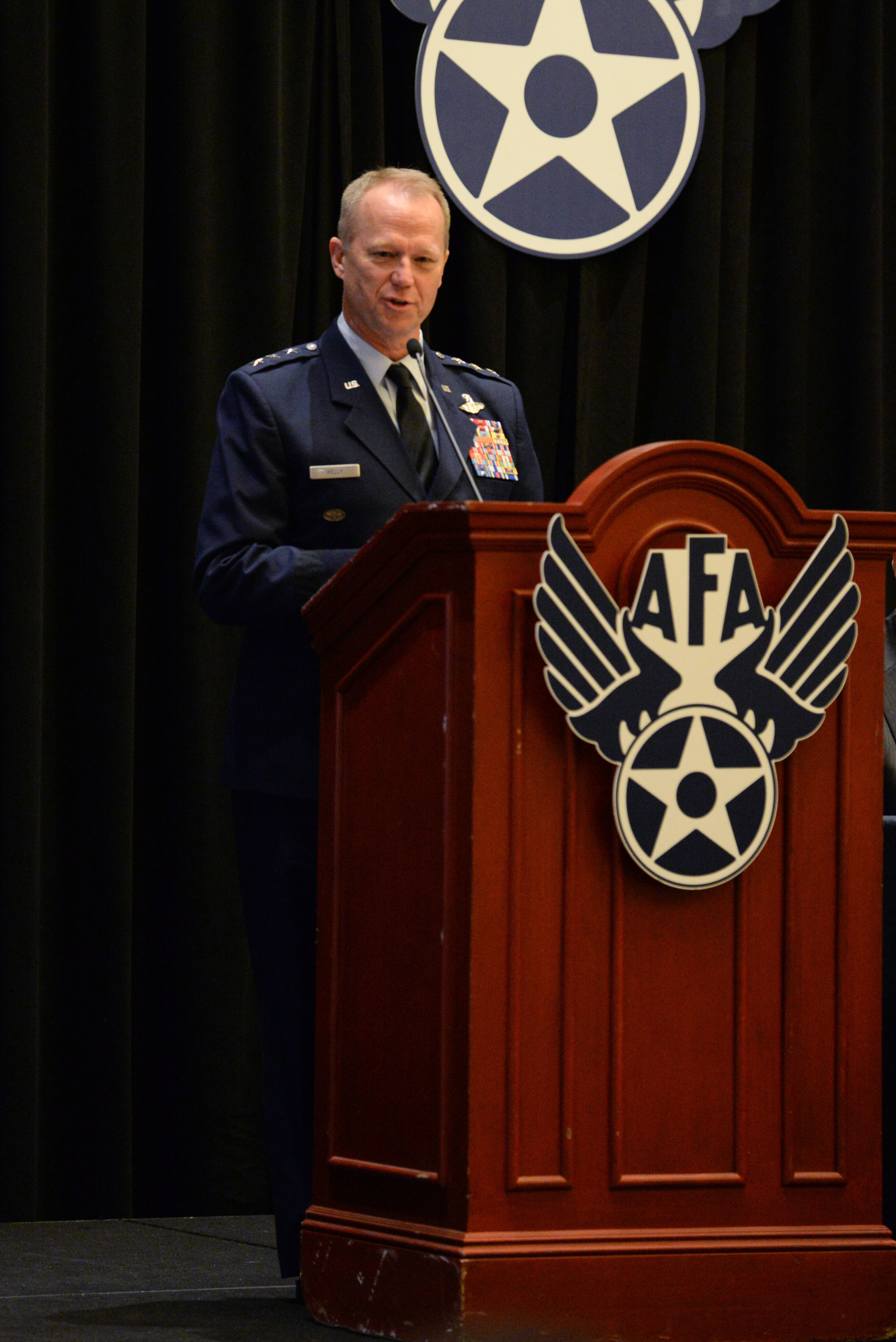
Lieutenant General Mark D. Kelly, Air Force deputy chief of staff for operations, gives a speech during the Air Force Association's annual conference on September 17, 2018.

In 2016, Kelly received his third star and relieved Lieutenant General Mark Nowland as commander of Twelfth Air Force and U.S. Air Forces Southern, the air component of the United States Southern Command, on October 3 of the same year. In August 2018 Kelly was appointed as the Deputy Chief of Staff for Operations of the United States Air Force, also relieving Nowland in the post. The position was one of the ten senior positions within the Air Staff, and in this capacity, Kelly was responsible with the tasked for development and implementation of policy which was directly supporting global operations, force management, weather, training, and readiness across the air, space and cyber fields.

=== Commander of Air Combat Command ===
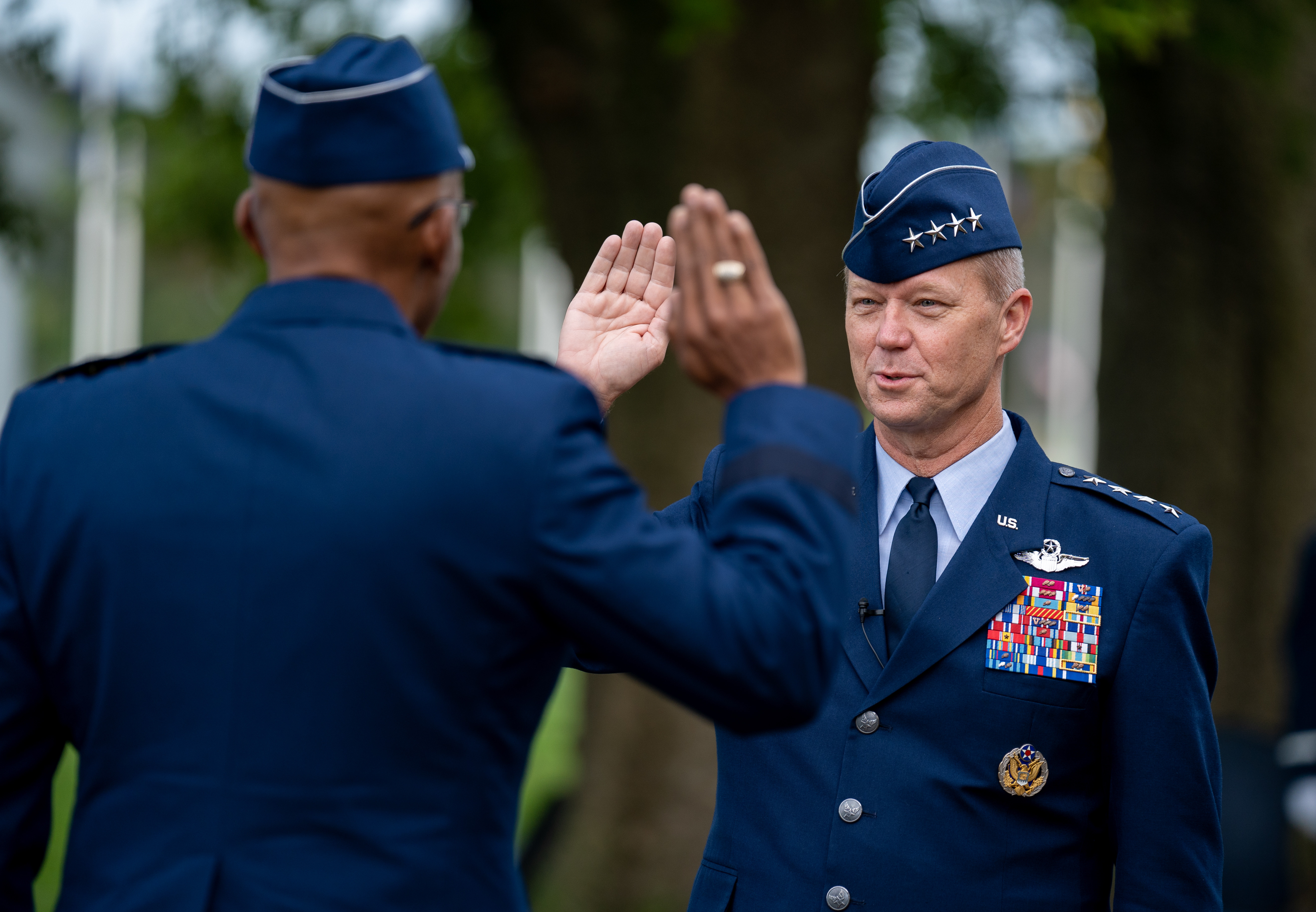
Kelly is administered the reaffirmation oath by Air Force Chief of Staff General Charles Q. Brown Jr. upon his promotion to general on August 28, 2020.

In June 2020, it was announced that Kelly would be appointed to the rank of general, and assigned to succeed the retiring James M. Holmes as the thirteenth commander of Air Combat Command. The nomination was received in the Senate on June 8, 2020, and confirmed on July 20, 2020. His promotion ceremony and subsequent assumption of command were both officiated on August 28, 2020, at Joint Base Langley–Eustis. Air Force chief of staff General Charles Q. Brown Jr. delivering the change-of-command ceremony remarks.

In this capacity, Kelly was responsible for organizing, training, equipping and maintaining the Air Force's combat-readiness, primarily through ACC's purpose as the primary provider of combat-ready forces to the service's major commands and service component commands. As ACC commander, Kelly also oversaw the development of strategy, doctrine, concepts, tactics, and procedures for air, space, and cyber-power employment and assisted sister agencies with intelligence, surveillance and crisis response capabilities.

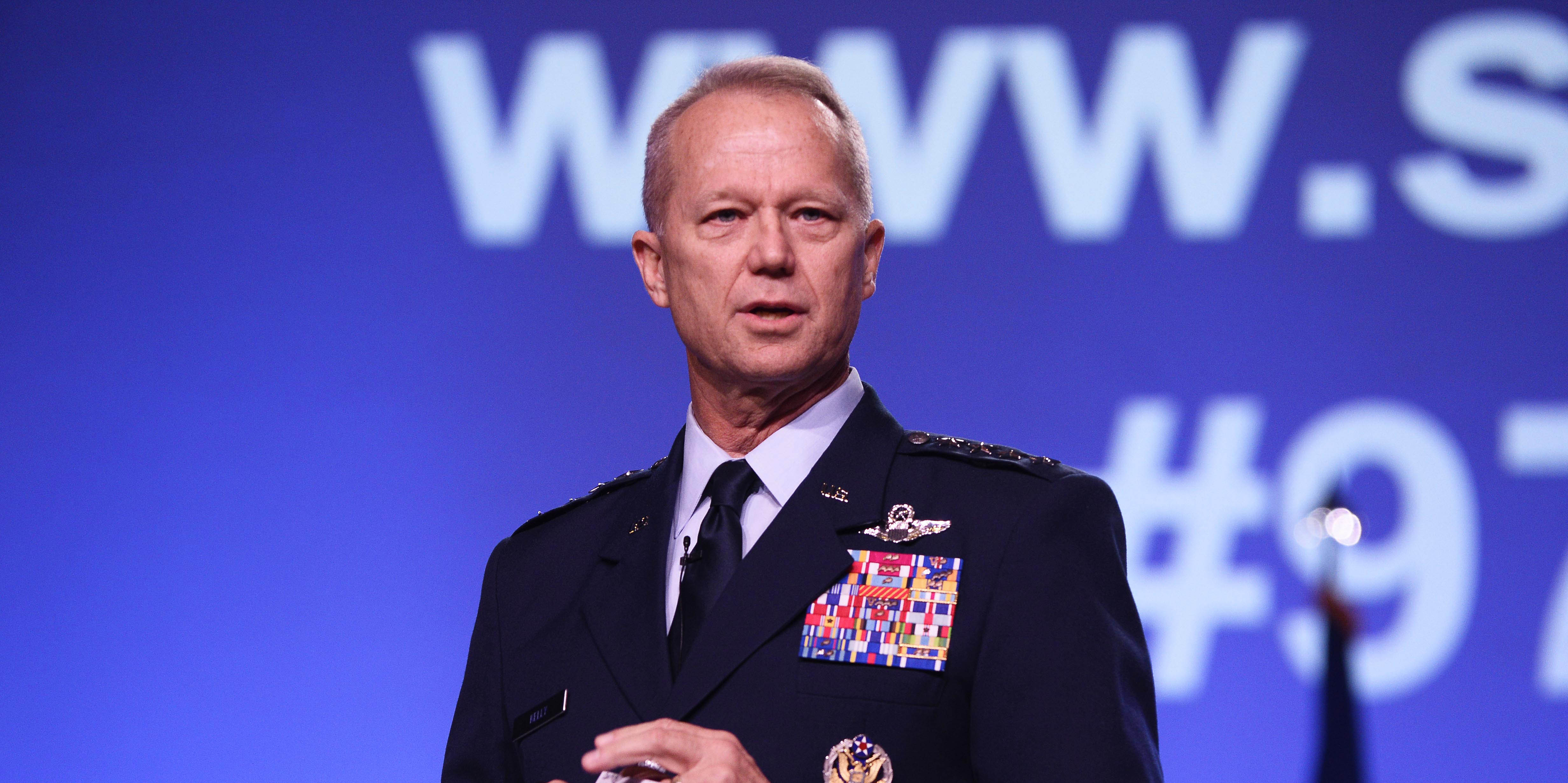
Kelly speaks at the Air Force Association's Air, Space & Cyber Conference on September 22, 2021.

Kelly oversaw an overhaul of the Air Combat Command's fighter training enterprise, based upon the new concept of "Rebuilding the Forge" that began under Kelly's predecessor, James M. Holmes. ACC summarily began a transition into using newer technologies to facilitate the training and assessment of fighter pilots, including the addition of the upcoming T-7A Red Hawk alongside front-line combat jets as training aircraft. This would reduce wear on such combat jets and leave more combat capacity for real-world contingencies. The concept was targeted to yield 60 percent more operational hours for F-22 Raptors and could save costs per flying hour by three to five times.

Speaking at the 2021 Air Force Association's Air, Space & Cyber Conference, Kelly emphasized the importance of American air superiority and the modernization of the fighter force, stating that a war with the People's Republic of China could end badly if the United States ever gave up air superiority to its competitor. At the same time, Kelly reaffirmed his commitment to shifting the fighter force to compete with China's, evolving from previous peer based adversaries such as Iraq and the Soviet Union. He stated that reinforcing the Air Force's ability to assume immediate control of the air was what foreign armed forces counted on, and that such a capability was necessary to maintain in the Air Force.

Kelly retired from active duty effective March 1, 2024.

== Flight information ==
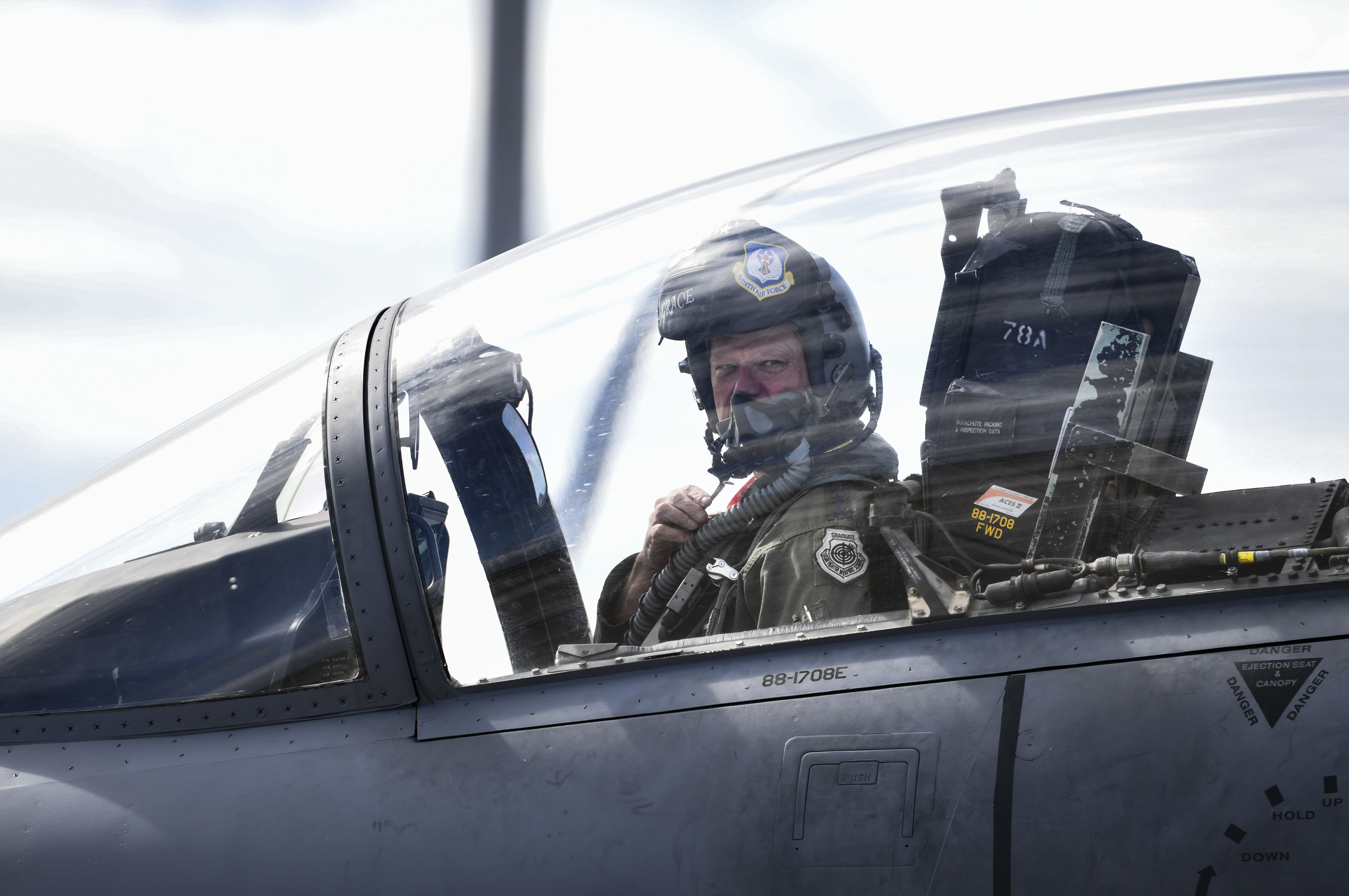
Kelly piloting a Boeing F-15E Strike Eagle.

Rating: command pilot

Flight hours: more than 6,000

Aircraft flown: T-37, T-38, F-15E, F/A-18, F-16, F-35A

== Education ==
- 1986 Bachelor of Arts, Mathematics, Southwest Texas State University, San Marcos.
- 1990 Squadron Officer School, Maxwell Air Force Base, Ala.
- 1996 U.S. Air Force Fighter Weapons School, Nellis AFB, Nev.
- 2001 Master of Military Arts and Sciences, Air Command and Staff College, Air University, Maxwell AFB, Ala.
- 2007 Master of Science, National Security Studies, National War College, Fort Lesley J. McNair, Washington, D.C.
- 2011 Harvard Kennedy School of Executive Education, Leadership Decision Making Seminar.

== Assignments ==
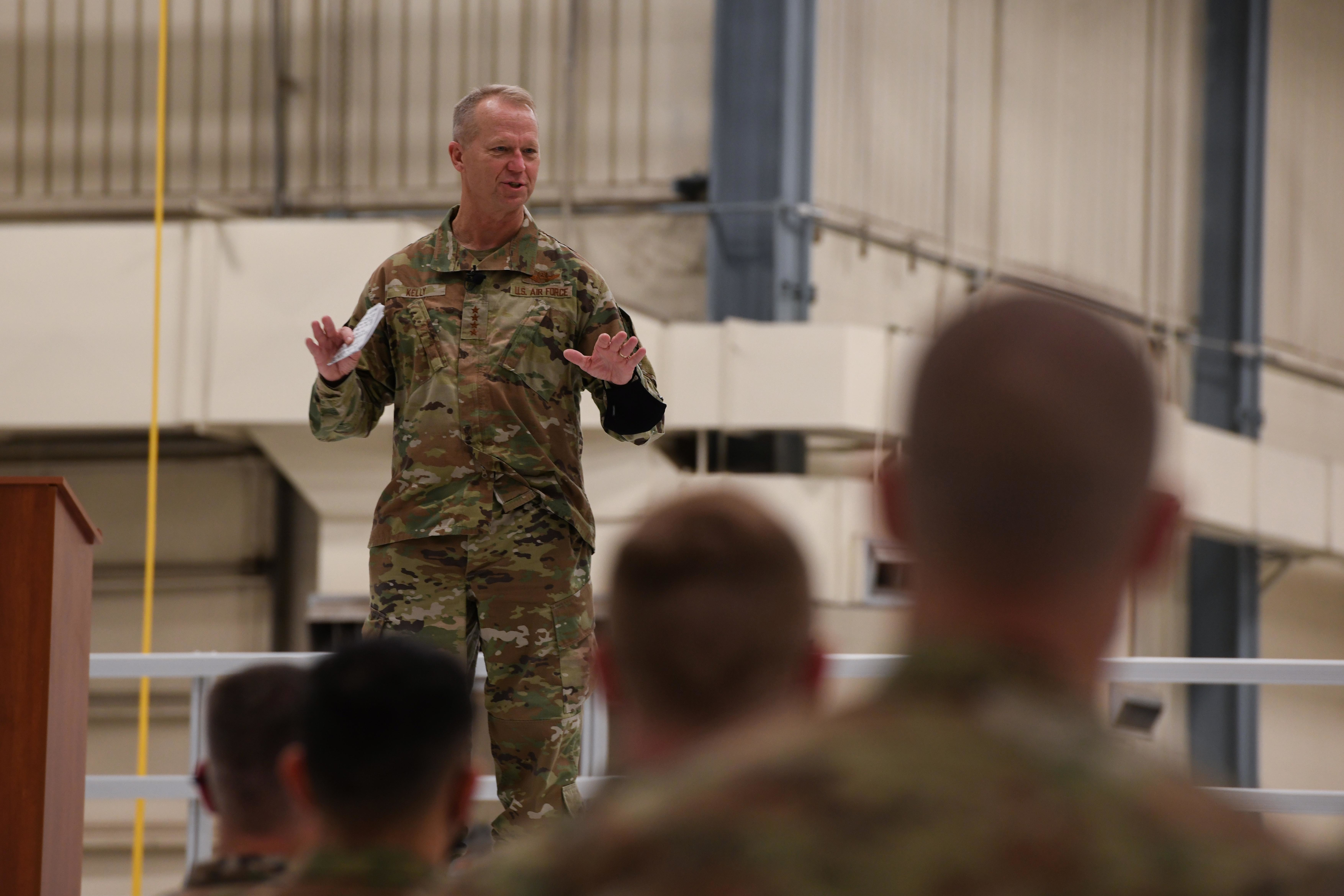
Kelly speaks to fellow airmen during a visit to Grand Forks Air Force Base on October 7, 2021.

1. April 1986–May 1987, Student Euro-NATO Joint Jet Pilot Training, Sheppard AFB, Texas.
2. June 1987–July 1991, T-37 Instructor Pilot, Executive Officer and Standardization and Evaluation Officer, 80th Flying Training Wing, Sheppard AFB, Texas.
3. August 1991–April 1992, Student, F-15E Replacement Training Unit, 461st Fighter Squadron, Luke AFB, Ariz.
4. April 1992–July 1995, F-15E Instructor Pilot and Weapons Officer, 90th Fighter Squadron, Elmendorf AFB, Alaska.
5. August 1995–January 1998, F-15E Instructor Pilot and Weapons Officer, 492d Fighter Squadron, RAF Lakenheath, United Kingdom
6. February 1998–June 2000, Assistant Director of Operations, 2nd Operational Conversion Unit, Royal Australian Air Force F/A-18 Fighter Weapons School, RAAF Williamtown, New South Wales, Australia.
7. July 2000–June 2001, Student, Air Command and Staff College, Maxwell AFB, Ala.
8. June 2001–September 2002, Weapons and Tactics Flight Commander, 4th Operations Support Squadron, Seymour Johnson AFB, N.C.
9. October 2002–March 2004, Director of Operations, 336th Fighter Squadron, Seymour Johnson AFB, N.C.
10. April 2004–May 2006, Commander, 333rd Fighter Squadron, Seymour Johnson AFB, N.C.
11. August 2006–June 2007, Student, National War College, Fort Lesley J. McNair, Washington, D.C.
12. July 2007–September 2008, Vice Commander, 366th Fighter Wing, Mountain Home AFB, Idaho, with duties as Vice Commander, 455th Air Expeditionary Wing, Bagram Airfield, Afghanistan.
13. September 2008–April 2010, Commander, 4th Fighter Wing, Seymour Johnson AFB, N.C.
14. April 2010–April 2011, Executive Officer, Deputy Commander, U.S. Pacific Command, Camp Smith, Hawaii.
15. April 2011–July 2012, Chief of Staff, Pacific Air Forces, Joint Base Pearl Harbor-Hickam, Hawaii.
16. July 2012–June 2014, Commander, 354th Fighter Wing, Eielson AFB, Alaska.
17. July 2014–July 2015, Commander, 455th Air Expeditionary Wing, Bagram Airfield, Afghanistan.
18. July 2015–May 2016, Commander, Ninth Air Force, Shaw AFB, S.C.
19. June 2016–September 2016, Special Assistant to the Commander, Air Combat Command, Joint Base Langley-Eustis, Va.
20. October 2016–August 2018, Commander, Twelfth Air Force, Air Combat Command, and Commander, Air Forces Southern, U.S. Southern Command, Davis-Monthan AFB, Ariz.
21. August 2018–August 2020, Deputy Chief of Staff, Operations, Headquarters United States Air Force, Arlington, Va.
22. August 2020–February 2024, Commander, ACC, Joint Base Langley-Eustis, Va.

== Awards and decorations ==
US Air Force Command Pilot Badge
Headquarters Air Force Badge
Unidentified badge

Defense Superior Service Medal with one bronze oak leaf cluster
Legion of Merit with two oak leaf clusters
Distinguished Flying Cross with Valor device and oak leaf cluster
Bronze Star Medal with oak leaf cluster
Meritorious Service Medal with three bronze oak leaf clusters
Air Medal with one silver and three bronze oak leaf clusters
Air Medal (second ribbon to denote tenth award)
Aerial Achievement Medal with oak leaf cluster
Air Force Commendation Medal with two bronze oak leaf clusters
Air Force Achievement Medal
Air Force Combat Action Medal
Joint Meritorious Unit Award
Air Force Meritorious Unit Award
Air Force Outstanding Unit Award with Valor device and three bronze oak leaf clusters
Air Force Outstanding Unit Award (second ribbon to denote fifth award)
Air Force Organizational Excellence Award
Combat Readiness Medal with oak leaf cluster
Air Force Recognition Ribbon
National Defense Service Medal with one bronze service star
Armed Forces Expeditionary Medal
Afghanistan Campaign Medal with service star
Global War on Terrorism Expeditionary Medal
Global War on Terrorism Service Medal
Armed Forces Service Medal
Nuclear Deterrence Operations Service Medal with oak leaf cluster
Air Force Overseas Long Tour Service Ribbon
Air Force Expeditionary Service Ribbon with gold frame and two oak leaf clusters
Air Force Longevity Service Award with one silver and three bronze oak leaf clusters
Air Force Training Ribbon
Royal Australian Air Force Chief of Staff Gold Medal
NATO Medal for the former Yugoslavia

== Dates of promotion ==
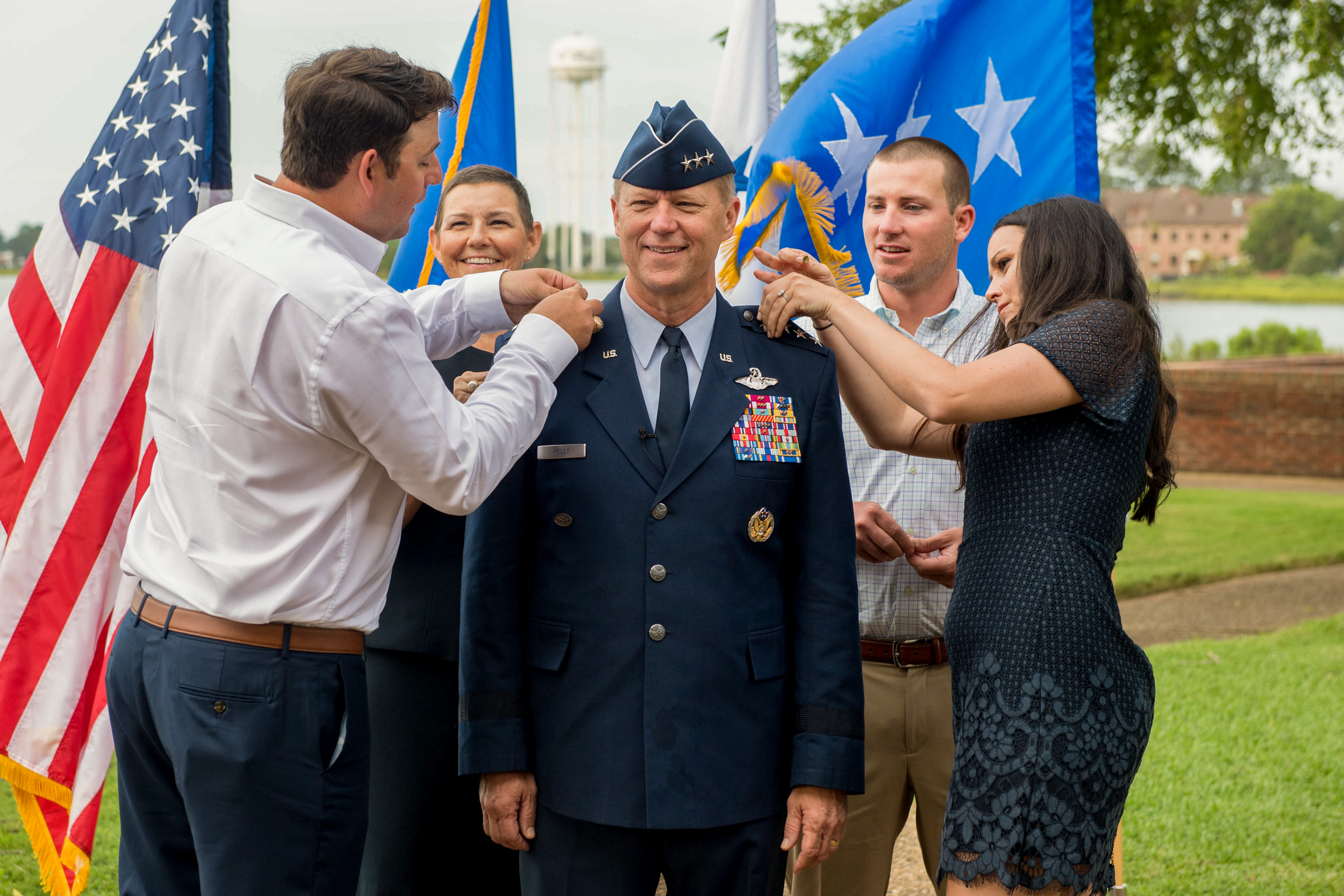
Kelly is pinned with his fourth star by his family on August 28, 2020.

Rank	Date
Second lieutenant	February 12, 1986
First lieutenant	February 12, 1988
Captain	February 12, 1990
Major	November 17, 1997
Lieutenant colonel	May 10, 2002
Colonel	January 1, 2007
Brigadier general	September 14, 2012
Major general	September 2, 2015
Lieutenant general	October 3, 2016
General	August 28, 2020

Military offices
Preceded by Steven L. Kwast	Commander of the 4th Fighter Wing; 2008–2010	Succeeded by Patrick J. Doherty
Preceded by James N. Post III	Commander of the 354th Fighter Wing; 2012–2014	Succeeded by Michael P. Winkler
Preceded by Patrick C. Malackowski	Commander of the 455th Air Expeditionary Wing; 2014–2015	Succeeded by David Julazadeh
Preceded by Gilmary M. Hostage III	Commander of the Ninth Air Force; 2015–2016	Succeeded by John W. Hesterman III
Preceded by Mark Nowland	Commander of the Twelfth Air Force; 2016–2018	Succeeded by Andrew A. Croft
Preceded by Mark Nowland	Deputy Chief of Staff for Operations of the United States Air Force; 2018–2020	Succeeded by Joseph T. Guastella
Preceded by James M. Holmes	Commander of Air Combat Command; 2020–2024	Succeeded by Kenneth S. Wilsbach
