= Thomas W. Bergeson =

United States Air Force general

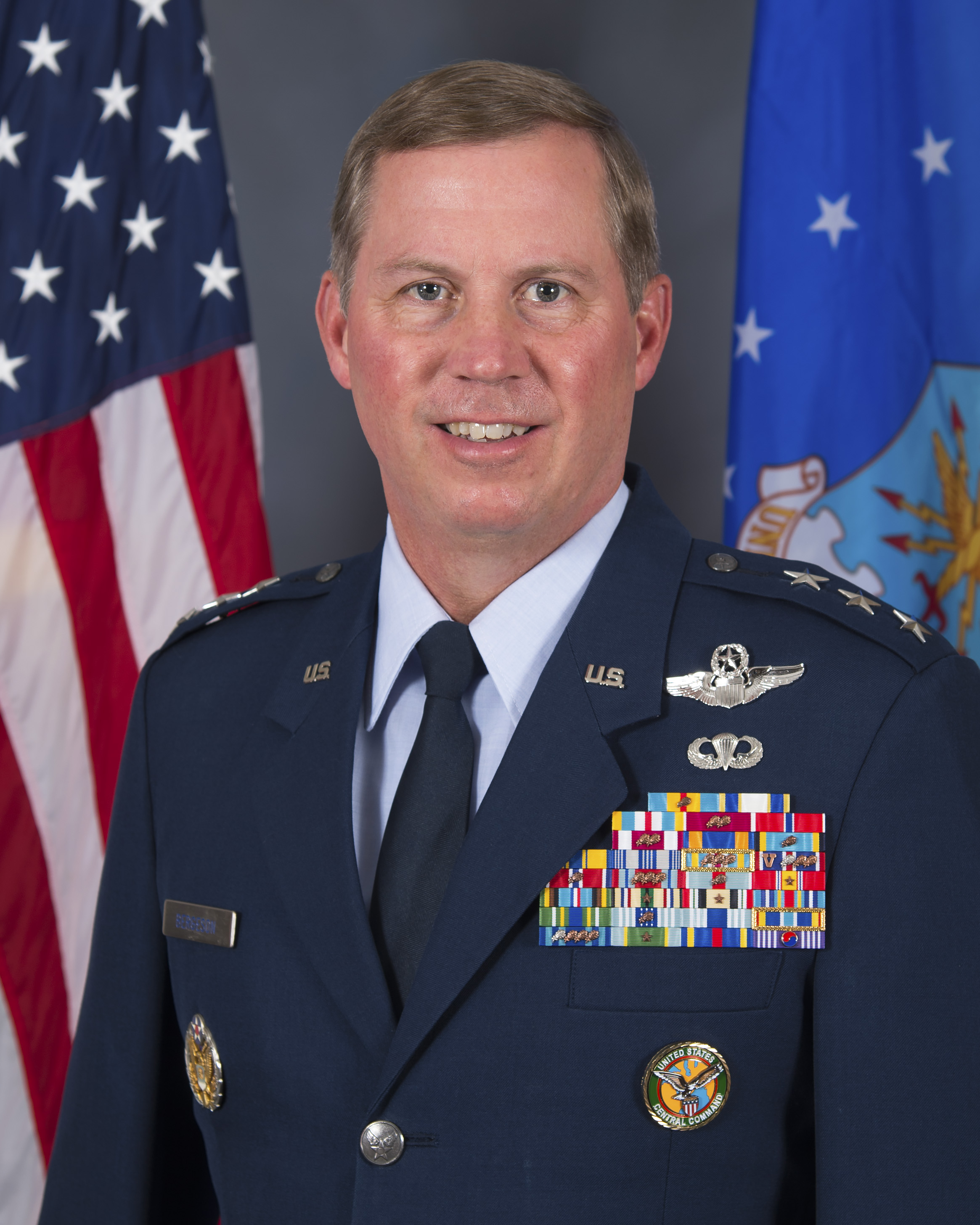
- Born: 1962 (age 63–64)
- Military career
- Allegiance: United States
- Branch: United States Air Force
- Service years: 1985–2020
- Rank: Lieutenant general
- Awards: Defense Distinguished Service Medal (2); Air Force Distinguished Service Medal; Defense Superior Service Medal; Legion of Merit (3)

Thomas William Bergeson (born 1962) is a retired lieutenant general in the United States Air Force, who last served as the deputy commander of United States Central Command. He was commissioned upon graduating from the United States Air Force Academy in 1985 and retired 1 September 2020.

== Awards and decorations ==
| US Air Force Command Pilot Badge |
| Basic Parachutist Badge |
| United States Central Command Badge |
| Headquarters Air Force Badge |

| Defense Distinguished Service Medal with one bronze oak leaf cluster |
| Air Force Distinguished Service Medal |
| Defense Superior Service Medal |
| Legion of Merit with two oak leaf clusters |
| Bronze Star Medal |
| Meritorious Service Medal with two oak leaf clusters |
| Air Medal |
| Aerial Achievement Medal with oak leaf cluster |
| Air Force Commendation Medal |
| Air Force Achievement Medal |
| Joint Meritorious Unit Award with three oak leaf clusters |
| Air Force Outstanding Unit Award with "V" device, one silver and two bronze oak leaf clusters |
| Air Force Organizational Excellence Award with oak leaf cluster |
| Combat Readiness Medal with three oak leaf clusters |
| Air Force Recognition Ribbon with oak leaf cluster |
| National Defense Service Medal with one bronze service star |
| Armed Forces Expeditionary Medal |
| Southwest Asia Service Medal with service star |
| Iraq Campaign Medal with service star |
| Global War on Terrorism Expeditionary Medal |
| Korea Defense Service Medal |
| Air Force Overseas Short Tour Service Ribbon with oak leaf cluster |
| Air Force Overseas Long Tour Service Ribbon |
| Air Force Expeditionary Service Ribbon with gold frame |
| Air Force Longevity Service Award with one silver and three bronze oak leaf clusters |
| Small Arms Expert Marksmanship Ribbon with service star |
| Air Force Training Ribbon |
| Order of National Security Merit (Republic of Korea), Gukseon Medal |

Military offices
| Preceded by Tod D. Wolters | Legislative Liaison of the United States Air Force; 2013–2016 | Succeeded by Steven L. Basham |
| Preceded by Terrence J. O'Shaughnessy | Commander of the Seventh Air Force; 2016–2018 | Succeeded by Kenneth S. Wilsbach |
| Preceded by Terrence J. O'Shaughnessy | Deputy Commander of the United Nations Command; 2016–2018 | Succeeded by Wayne Eyre |
| Preceded by Charles Q. Brown Jr. | Deputy Commander of the United States Central Command; 2018–2020 | Succeeded by James J. Malloy |
