= James M. Holmes =

United States Air Force general

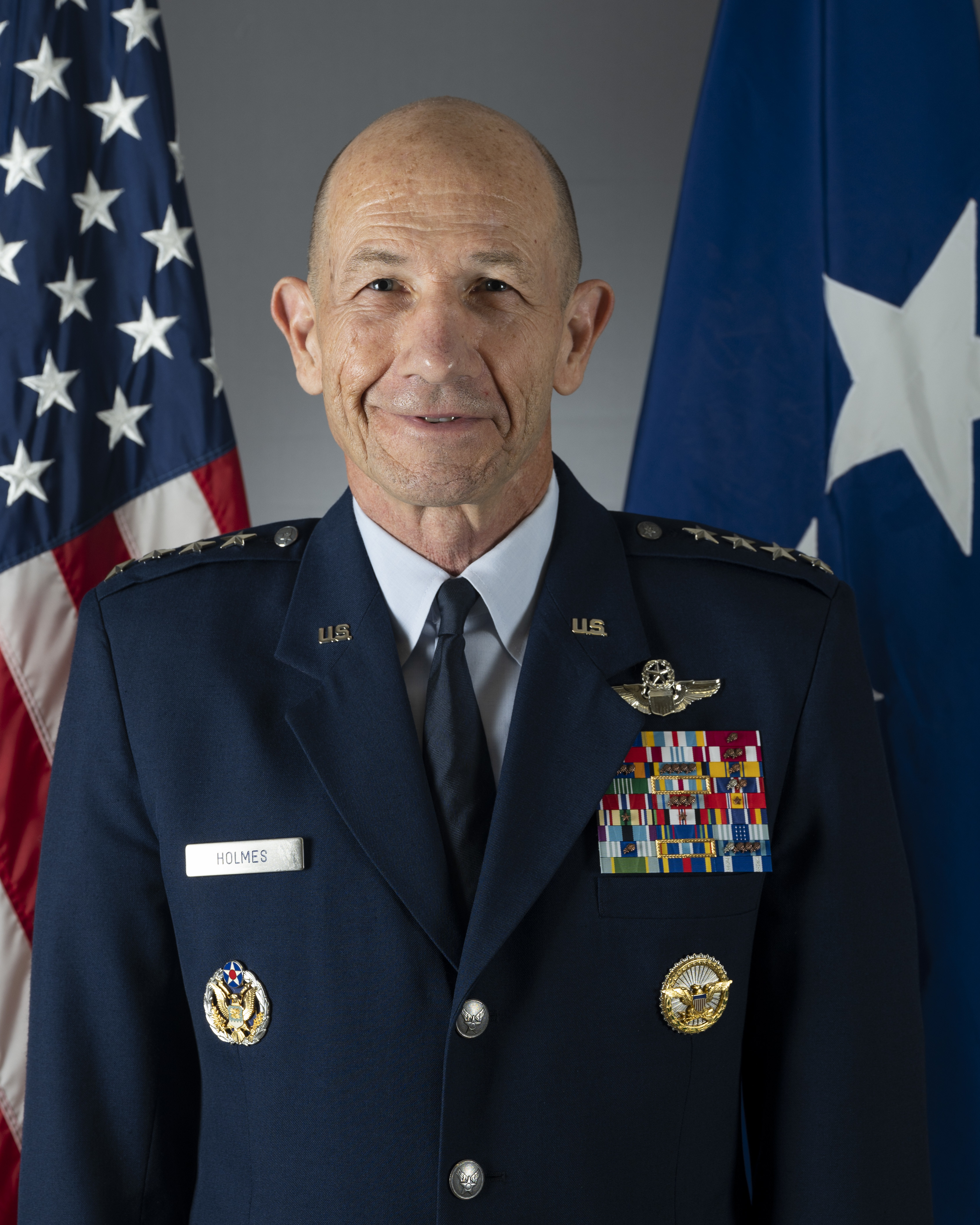
- General James M. Holmes in 2020
- Born: April 12, 1957 (age 69)
- Military career
- Allegiance: United States
- Branch: United States Air Force
- Service years: 1981–2020
- Rank: General
- Nickname: Mike
- Commands: Air Combat Command; 455th Air Expeditionary Wing; 4th Fighter Wing; 14th Operations Group; 27th Fighter Squadron
- Conflicts: War in Afghanistan
- Awards: Air Force Distinguished Service Medal (2); Defense Superior Service Medal; Legion of Merit (2); Bronze Star Medal

James Michael Holmes (born April 12, 1957) is a retired United States Air Force general. He was the Deputy Chief of Staff for Strategic Plans and Requirements at Headquarters United States Air Force in Washington, D.C., before he became the commander of Air Combat Command on March 10, 2017. He was succeeded by Mark D. Kelly and retired effective 1 October 2020.

== Military career ==
Holmes entered the United States Air Force through Officer Training School in 1981 after receiving a degree in electrical engineering from the University of Tennessee. He has commanded the 27th Fighter Squadron, the 14th Operations Group, the 4th Fighter Wing and the 455th Air Expeditionary Wing. He has served in the Office of the Secretary of Defense and on headquarters staffs of the United States Air Force, United States European Command and Pacific Air Forces. Prior to his current position, he served as the Deputy Chief of Staff for Strategic Plans and Requirements, Headquarters United States Air Force, Washington, D.C.

Holmes is a command pilot with more than 4,000 hours, including more than 500 combat hours in the F-15A/B/C/D/E, and has also flown the T-38, T-37 and T-1A. His previous assignments include Special Assistant to the Assistant Vice Chief of Staff and Director of the Air Staff, Principal Director for Middle East Policy in the Office of the Under Secretary of Defense for Policy, Director of Strategic Planning with the Deputy Chief of Staff for Strategic Plans and Programs, Assistant Deputy Chief of Staff for Operations for Plans and Requirements, and Vice Commander of the Air Education and Training Command.

Holmes was nominated for promotion to commanding general of the Air Combat Command on 6 September 2016. This nomination was confirmed by the United States Senate on 7 December 2016. He then took over from General Hawk Carlisle on 10 March 2017. As the Commander, Air Combat Command he is responsible for organizing, training, equipping and maintaining combat-ready forces for rapid deployment and employment while ensuring strategic air defense forces are ready to meet the challenges of peacetime air sovereignty and wartime defense. The command operates more than 1,300 aircraft, 34 wings, 19 bases, and more than 70 operating locations worldwide with 94,000 active-duty and civilian personnel. When mobilized, the Air National Guard and Air Force Reserve contribute more than 700 aircraft and 49,000 people to ACC. As the Combat Air Forces lead agent, ACC develops strategy, doctrine, concepts, tactics, and procedures for air- and space-power employment. The command provides conventional and information warfare forces to all unified commands to ensure air, space and information superiority for warfighters and national decision-makers. The command can also be called upon to assist national agencies with intelligence, surveillance and crisis response capabilities.

== Education ==
- 1981 Bachelor of Science degree in electrical engineering, University of Tennessee, Knoxville
- 1986 F-15 Fighter Weapons Instructor Course, U.S. Air Force Fighter Weapons School, Nellis AFB, Nev.
- 1987 Squadron Officer School, Maxwell Air Force Base, Ala.
- 1993 Air Command and Staff College, Maxwell AFB, Ala.
- 1993 Master of Arts degree in history, University of Alabama, Tuscaloosa
- 1994 Master of Airpower Arts and Sciences degree, School of Advanced Airpower Studies, Air University, Maxwell AFB, Ala.
- 1995 Armed Forces Staff College, Norfolk, Va.
- 2000 Air War College, by correspondence
- 2001 Master's degree in national defense studies, Naval War College, Newport, R.I.
- 2006 National Defense Studies Fellow, Maxwell School of Citizenship and Public Affairs, Syracuse University, N.Y.
- 2007 Joint Force Air Component Commander Course, Air University, Maxwell AFB, Ala.
- 2010 AFSO21 Executive Leadership Course, University of Tennessee, Knoxville.
- 2011 Coalition Force Maritime Component Commander Course, Naval War College, Bahrain
- 2013 Joint Flag Officer Warfighting Course, Air University, Maxwell AFB, Ala.

== Assignments ==
1. September 1981 – August 1982, student, undergraduate pilot training, Columbus AFB, Miss.
2. September 1982 – November 1982, student, fighter lead-in training, Holloman AFB, N.M.
3. November 1982 – April 1983, student, F-15 conversion training, Luke AFB, Ariz.
4. May 1983 – December 1985, F-15 instructor pilot and Assistant Squadron and Wing Weapons Officer, 71st Tactical Fighter Squadron, Langley AFB, Va.
5. January 1986 – May 1986, student, USAF F-15 Fighter Weapons Instructor Course, Nellis AFB, Nev.
6. May 1986 – May 1989, F-15 Chief of Weapons and Tactics, 44th Tactical Fighter Squadron, Kadena Air Base, Japan
7. May 1989 – June 1992, F-15 Chief of Weapons and Tactics, Assistant Chief of Wing Weapons and Tactics, Flight Commander and Assistant Operations Officer, 7th Tactical Fighter Squadron and 9th Fighter Squadron, Holloman AFB, N.M.
8. July 1992 – June 1993, student, Air Command and Staff College, Air University, Maxwell AFB, Ala.
9. July 1993 – June 1994, student, School for Advanced Airpower Studies, Air University, Maxwell AFB, Ala.
10. July 1994 – October 1996, Air Operations Officer and Crisis Action Planner, Operations Directorate, Headquarters U.S. European Command, Stuttgart-Vaihingen, Germany
11. October 1996 – December 1997, Assistant Operations Officer, 27th Fighter Squadron, Langley AFB, Va.
12. January 1998 – May 1999, Operations Officer, 71st Fighter Squadron, Langley AFB, Va.
13. May 1999 – July 2000, Commander, 27th Fighter Squadron, Langley AFB, Va.
14. July 2000 – July 2001, student, Naval War College, Newport, R.I.
15. July 2001 – August 2002, Chief, Strategy, Concepts and Doctrine Division, Directorate of Operational Plans and Joint Matters, Headquarters U.S. Air Force, Washington, D.C.
16. August 2002 – July 2004, Commander, 14th Operations Group, Columbus AFB, Miss.
17. August 2004 – September 2006, Commander, 4th Fighter Wing, Seymour Johnson AFB, N.C.
18. September 2006 – June 2007, Chief, Checkmate, Directorate of Operational Plans and Joint Matters, Headquarters U.S. Air Force, Washington, D.C.
19. July 2007 – December 2007, Director of Strategic Plans, Programs and International Affairs, Headquarters Pacific Air Forces, Hickam AFB, Hawaii
20. December 2007 – March 2008, Special Assistant to the Director of Operational Planning, Policy and Strategy, Deputy Chief of Staff for Operations, Plans and Requirements, Headquarters U.S. Air Force, Washington, D.C.
21. March 2008 – April 2009, Commander, 455th Air Expeditionary Wing, Bagram Air Base, Afghanistan
22. April 2009 – July 2009, Special Assistant to the Assistant Vice Chief of Staff, and Director, Air Staff, Headquarters U.S. Air Force, Washington, D.C.
23. July 2009 – August 2011, Principal Director for Middle East Policy, Office of the Under Secretary of Defense for Policy, Office of the Secretary of Defense, the Pentagon, Washington, D.C.
24. August 2011 – January 2012, Director, Strategic Planning, Deputy Chief of Staff for Strategic Plans and Programs, Headquarters U.S. Air Force, Washington D.C.
25. January 2012 – July 2013, Assistant Deputy Chief of Staff for Operations, Plans and Requirements, Headquarters U.S. Air Force, Washington, D.C.
26. August 2013 – July 2014, Vice Commander, Air Education and Training Command, Joint Base San Antonio-Randolph, Texas
27. August 2014 – March 2017, Deputy Chief of Staff for Strategic Plans and Requirements, Headquarters U.S. Air Force, Washington, D.C.
28. March 2017 – August 2020, Commander, Air Combat Command, Langley AFB, Va.

== Flight information ==
Rating: Command pilot
Flight hours: More than 4,000.
Aircraft flown: F-15A/B/C/D/E, T/AT-38, T-37 and T-1A.

== Awards and decorations ==
US Air Force Command Pilot Badge
Office of the Secretary of Defense Identification Badge
Headquarters Air Force Badge

Air Force Distinguished Service Medal with one bronze oak leaf cluster
Defense Superior Service Medal
Legion of Merit with oak leaf cluster
Bronze Star Medal
Defense Meritorious Service Medal
Meritorious Service Medal with two bronze oak leaf clusters
Air Medal with three oak leaf clusters
Aerial Achievement Medal with three oak leaf clusters
Air Force Commendation Medal with oak leaf cluster
Army Commendation Medal
Joint Meritorious Unit Award
Air Force Outstanding Unit Award with silver and bronze oak leaf clusters
Air Force Organizational Excellence Award
Combat Readiness Medal
National Defense Service Medal with one bronze service star
Southwest Asia Service Medal with one service star
Afghanistan Campaign Medal with one service star
Global War on Terrorism Service Medal
Humanitarian Service Medal
Nuclear Deterrence Operations Service Medal
Air Force Overseas Short Tour Service Ribbon
Air Force Overseas Long Tour Service Ribbon with oak leaf cluster
Air Force Expeditionary Service Ribbon with gold frame
Air Force Longevity Service Award with silver and three bronze oak leaf clusters
Small Arms Expert Marksmanship Ribbon
Air Force Training Ribbon
NATO Medal for service with ISAF

Gen Holmes received the Order of the Sword on July 28, 2020.

== Effective dates of promotion ==
Promotions
Insignia	Rank	Date
	General	March 10, 2017
	Lieutenant General	August 2, 2013
	Major General	January 28, 2011
	Brigadier General	May 2, 2008
	Colonel	July 1, 2002
	Lieutenant Colonel	January 1, 1998
	Major	May 1, 1993
	Captain	August 28, 1985
	First Lieutenant	August 28, 1983
	Second Lieutenant	August 28, 1981

Military offices
Preceded by ???	Commander of the 455th Air Expeditionary Wing; 2008–2009	Succeeded by Steven L. Kwast
Preceded by ???	Director of Strategic Planning of the United States Air Force; 2011–2012	Succeeded by Richard A. Klumpp
Preceded by ???	Assistant Deputy Chief of Staff for Operations, Plans, and Requirement of the United States Air Force; 2012–2013	Succeeded by James J. Jones
Preceded by ???	Vice Commander of the Air Education and Training Command; 2013–2014	Succeeded by Leonard A. Patrick
Preceded by Michael R. Moeller as Deputy Chief of Staff for Strategic Plans and Requirements	Deputy Chief of Staff for Strategic Plans, and Requirements of the United States Air Force; 2014–2017	Succeeded by Jerry D. Harris Jr.
Preceded by Herbert J. Carlisle	Commander of the Air Combat Command; 2017–2020	Succeeded by Mark D. Kelly
