= Mark Nowland =

United States Air Force general

Lieutenant General Mark C. Nowland
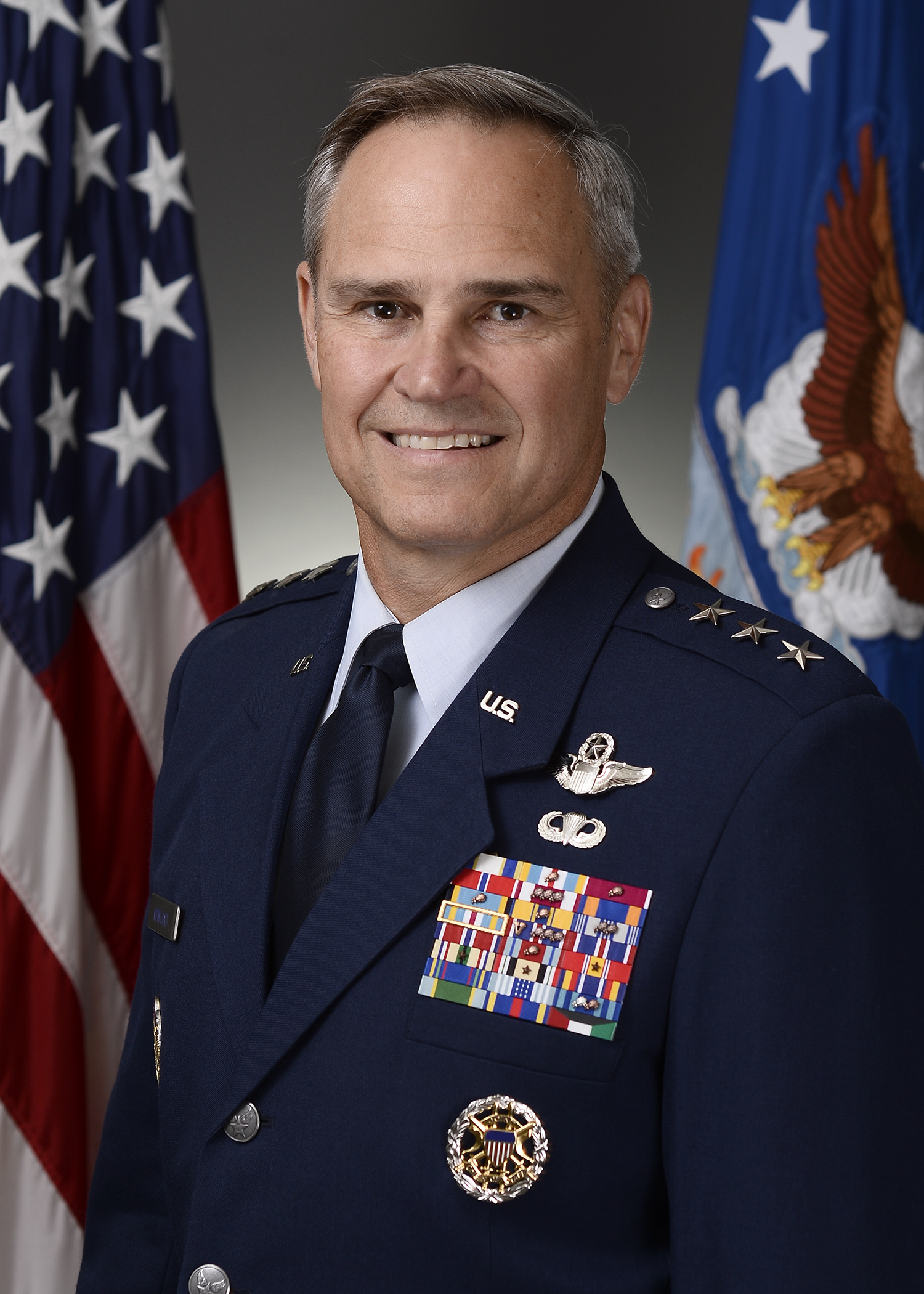
- Born: February 6, 1958 (age 68)
- Alma mater: United States Air Force Academy (BS); Embry–Riddle Aeronautical University (MS)
- Military career
- Allegiance: United States
- Branch: United States Air Force
- Service years: 1985 – 2018
- Rank: Lieutenant General
- Commands: Twelfth Air Force; 71st Flying Training Wing; 1st Operations Support Squadron
- Awards: Air Force Distinguished Service Medal; Defense Superior Service Medal (2); Legion of Merit (2)

Mark C. "Chris" Nowland (born February 6, 1958) is a retired United States Air Force lieutenant general.

He last served as the Deputy Chief of Staff for Operations, Plans and Requirements, Headquarters, United States Air Force from October 2016 to October 2018. In that role, he was responsible to the Secretary of the Air Force and the Chief of Staff for formulating policy supporting air, space, cyber, and irregular warfare, counter proliferation, homeland security and weather operations. As the Air Force operations deputy to the Joint Chief of Staff, the general determined operational requirements, capabilities and training necessary to support national security objectives and military strategy.

General Nowland is the son of Col. Benoni “Ben” Nowland IV who earned several medals in Vietnam including a Distinguished Flying Cross. General Nowland followed in his father's career as a 1985 graduate from the U.S. Air Force Academy. He has commanded at the squadron, wing and numbered Air Force levels. He also served on the Joint Staff, U.S. Southern Command and two Air Force major command staffs. The general has flown combat operations in support of operations Southern Watch and Iraqi Freedom. He is also a graduate of the School of Advanced Air and Space Studies and was a National Security Fellow at the Olin Institute at Harvard University. Prior to his final assignment as Deputy Chief of Staff for Operations, Plans and Requirements, General Nowland was the Commander, 12th Air Force, Air Combat Command and Commander, Air Forces Southern, U.S. Southern Command, Davis-Monthan Air Force Base, Arizona.

General Nowland is a command pilot with more than 3,600 flying hours, primarily in the A-10, F-15A/C/D, T-37B, T-38A/C, A/T-38B and T-6.

== Awards and decorations ==
US Air Force Command Pilot Badge
Basic Parachutist Badge
Office of the Joint Chiefs of Staff Identification Badge
Headquarters Air Force Badge

Air Force Distinguished Service Medal
Defense Superior Service Medal with one bronze oak leaf cluster
Legion of Merit with oak leaf cluster
Bronze Star Medal
Meritorious Service Medal with three bronze oak leaf clusters
Air Medal
Aerial Achievement Medal with oak leaf cluster
Air Force Commendation Medal with oak leaf cluster
Air Force Achievement Medal with two oak leaf clusters
Joint Meritorious Unit Award
Air Force Outstanding Unit Award with Valor device and three bronze oak leaf clusters
Air Force Outstanding Unit Award (second ribbon to denote fifth award)
Air Force Organizational Excellence Award
Combat Readiness Medal with oak leaf cluster
National Defense Service Medal with one bronze service star
Southwest Asia Service Medal with service star
Iraq Campaign Medal with one service star
Global War on Terrorism Service Medal
Nuclear Deterrence Operations Service Medal
Air Force Overseas Short Tour Service Ribbon
Air Force Longevity Service Award with one silver and two bronze oak leaf clusters
Small Arms Expert Marksmanship Ribbon
Air Force Training Ribbon
Order of Aeronautical Merit, Grand Cross (Chile)
SICOFAA Legion of Merit, Grand Cross
Kuwait Liberation Medal (Kuwait)

Military offices
Preceded by Joseph P. DiSalvo	Chief of Staff of the United States Southern Command; 2013–2014	Succeeded by Michael T. Plehn
Preceded by Tod D. Wolters	Commander of the Twelfth Air Force; 2014–2016	Succeeded by Mark D. Kelly
Preceded by John W. Raymond	Deputy Chief of Staff for Operations of the United States Air Force; 2016–2018	Succeeded by Mark D. Kelly
