= Tod D. Wolters =

United States Air Force general (born 1960)

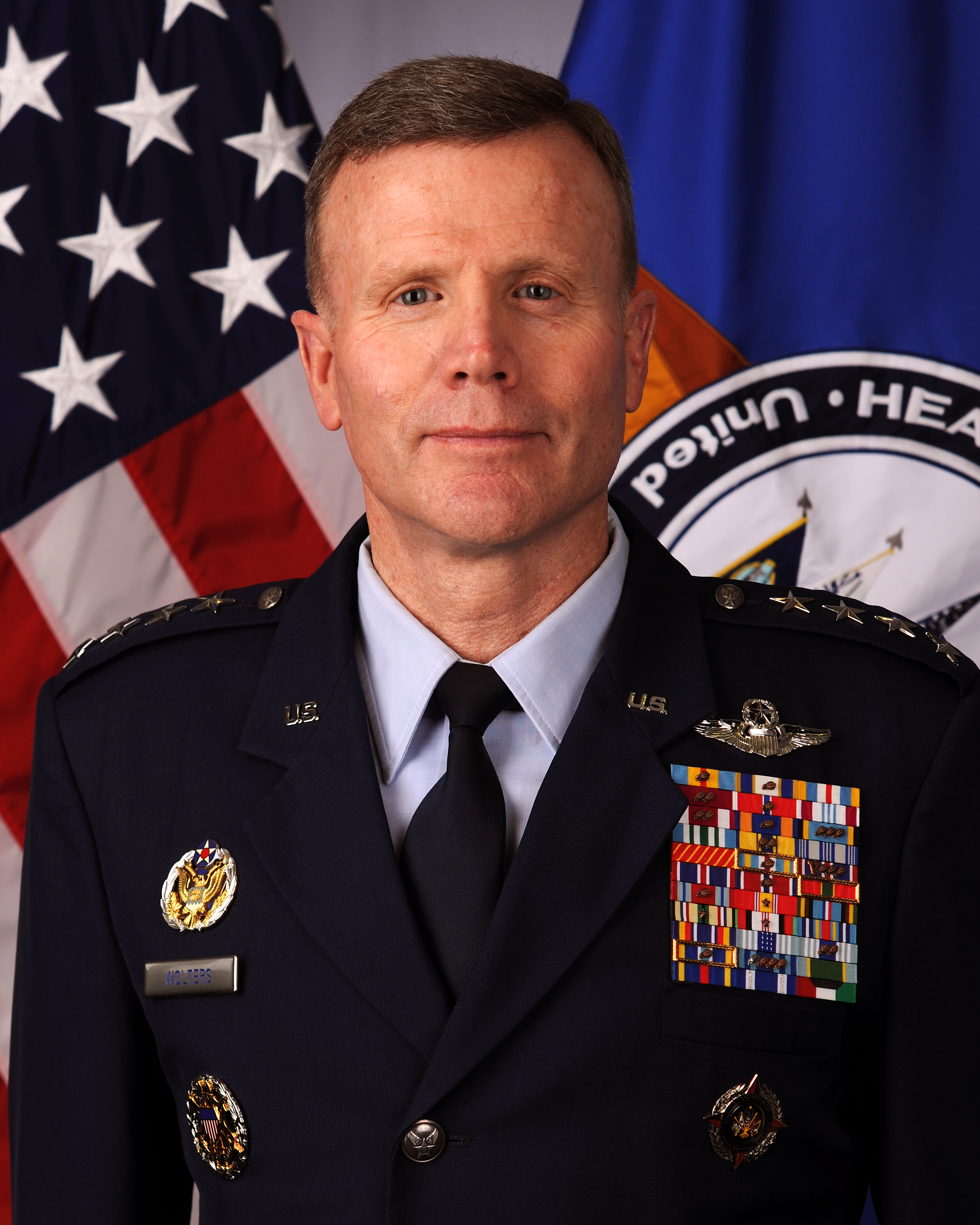
- General Tod D. Wolters
- Born: October 13, 1960 (age 66); Hiawatha, Kansas, U.S.
- Alma mater: United States Air Force Academy (BS); Air Command and Staff College; Armed Forces Staff College; Embry-Riddle Aeronautical University; United States Army War College
- Military career
- Allegiance: United States
- Branch: United States Air Force
- Service years: 1982–2022
- Rank: General
- Nickname: "Magoo"
- Commands: United States European Command; Supreme Allied Commander Europe; United States Air Forces in Europe; Allied Air Command; Twelfth Air Force; 9th Air and Space Expeditionary Task Force; 325th Fighter Wing; 47th Flying Training Wing; 1st Operations Group; 485th Air Expeditionary Wing; 19th Fighter Squadron
- Conflicts: Gulf War; War in Afghanistan; Iraq War
- Awards: Defense Distinguished Service Medal (3); Air Force Distinguished Service Medal (2); Defense Superior Service Medal; Legion of Merit (3); Bronze Star Medal (2)
- Tod D. Wolters's voice Wolters's opening statement at a House Armed Services Committee hearing on the security environment in Europe; Recorded March 30, 2022

Tod Daniel Wolters (born October 13, 1960) is a retired United States Air Force four-star general who last served as the commander of U.S. European Command and concurrently as NATO's Supreme Allied Commander Europe (SACEUR). He previously served as the commander of U.S. Air Forces in Europe and U.S. Air Forces Africa. He assumed his capstone assignment at the European Command in Germany on May 2, 2019 and at the Allied Command in Belgium on May 3, 2019.

== Military career ==
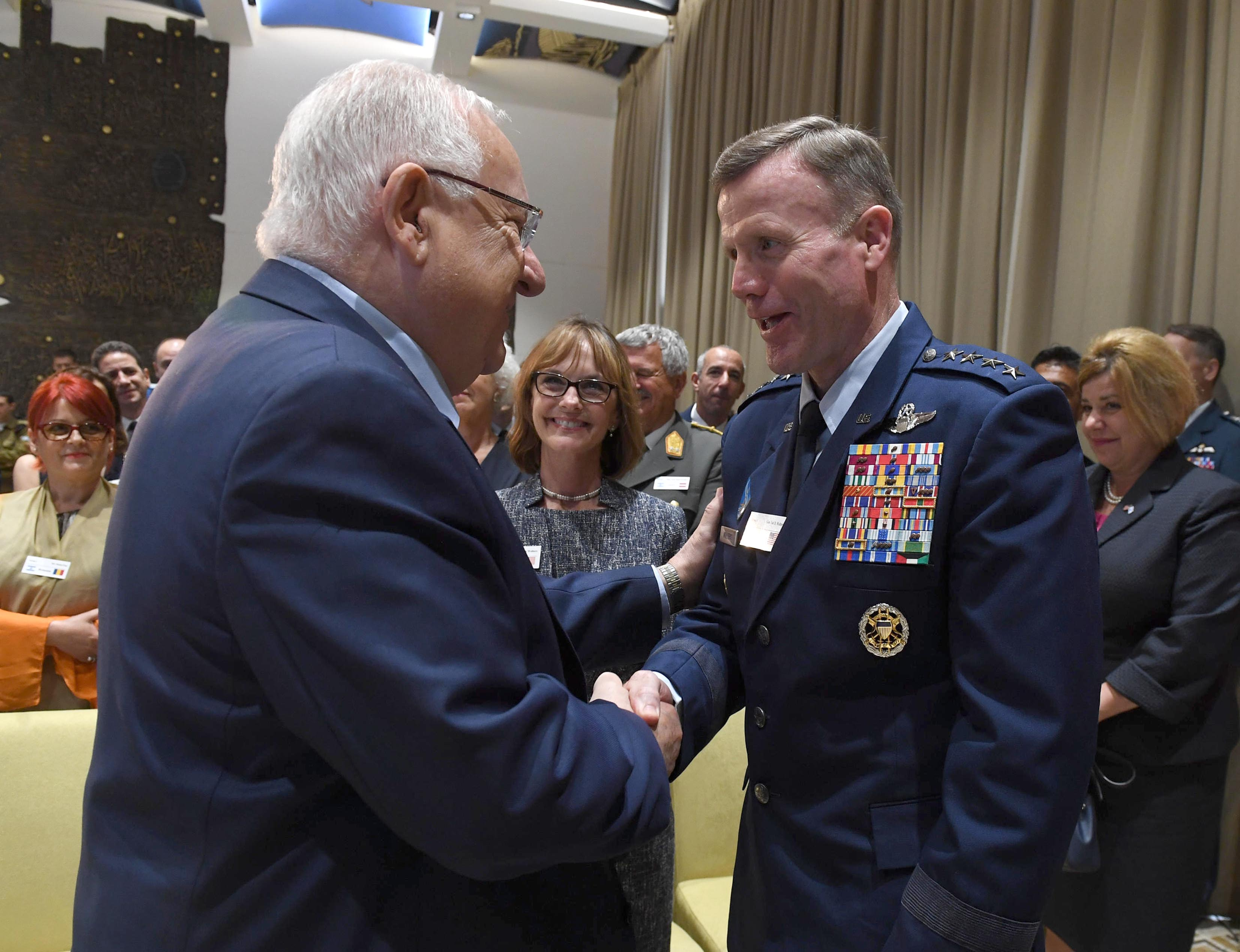
SACEUR Gen. Tod D. Wolters with Israeli President Reuven Rivlin.

The son of Air Force Brigadier General Thomas E. Wolters, Wolters received his commission in 1982 as a graduate of the United States Air Force Academy. He has commanded the 19th Fighter Squadron, Elmendorf AFB, Alaska; the 1st Operations Group, Langley AFB, Virginia; the 485th Air Expeditionary Wing, Saudi Arabia; the 47th Flying Training Wing, Laughlin AFB, Texas; the 325th Fighter Wing, Tyndall AFB, Florida; the 9th Air and Space Expeditionary Task Force-Afghanistan; and the Twelfth Air Force, Davis-Monthan Air Force Base, Arizona. He has fought in operations Desert Storm, Southern Watch, Iraqi Freedom and Enduring Freedom.

Wolters served in the Office of the Secretary of the Air Force, as Director of Legislative Liaison, and in Headquarters' staff positions at United States Pacific Command, Headquarters United States Air Force, and Air Force Space Command.

Prior to Wolters' appointment as SACEUR, he was the Director for Operations, Joint Staff, Washington, D.C. He assisted the Chairman of the Joint Chiefs of Staff in fulfilling his responsibilities as the principal military advisor to the President and Secretary of Defense. Wolters develops and provides strategic guidance to the combatant commands and relays communications between the President and the Secretary of Defense to the combatant commanders regarding current operations and plans.

Wolters is a command pilot with more than 5,000 flying hours in the F-15C, F-22, OV-10, T-38 and A-10 aircraft.

== Education ==
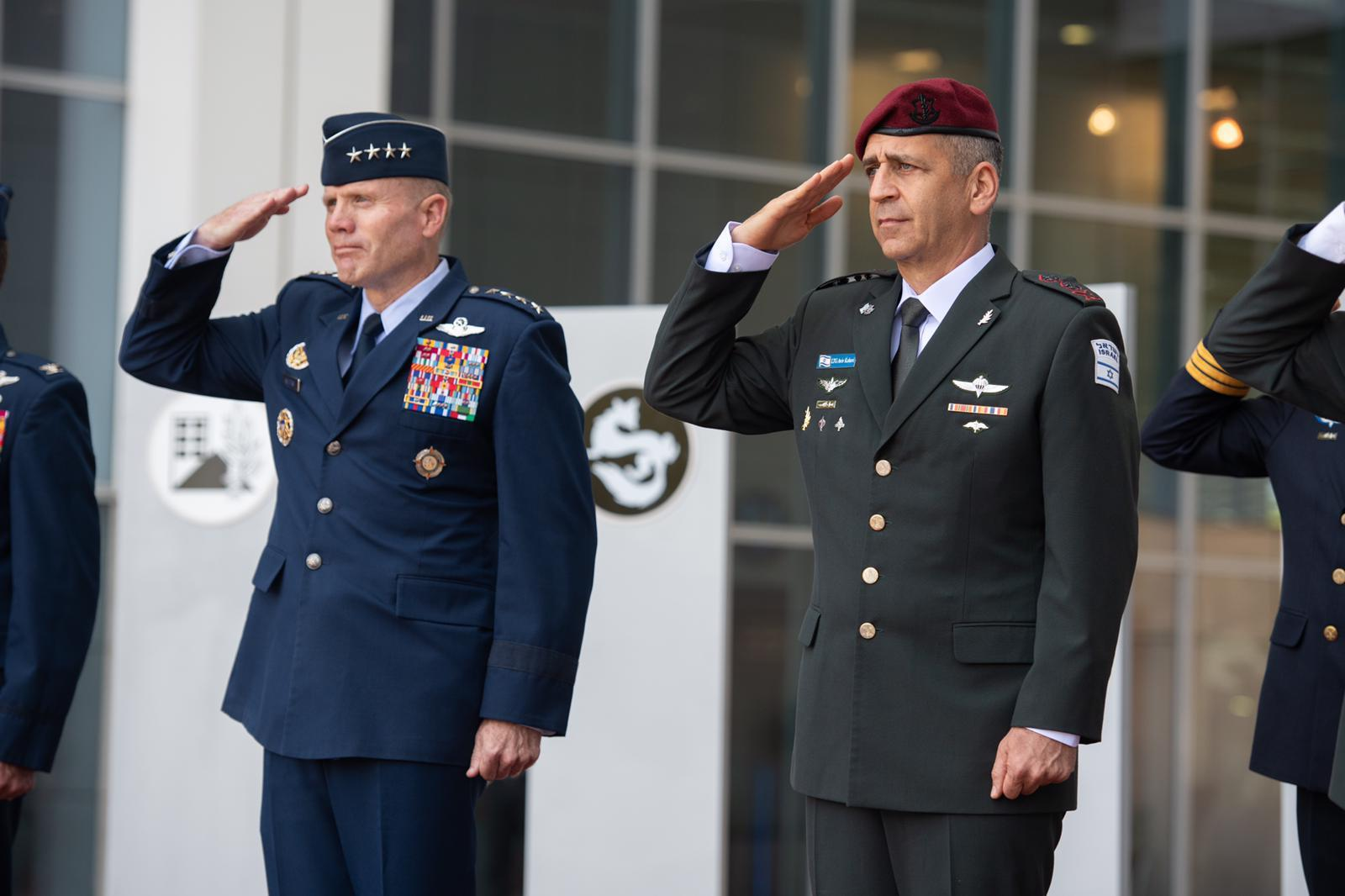
Supreme Allied Commander Europe General Tod D. Wolters with IDF Chief of General Staff Lieutenant General Aviv Kochavi.

- 1982 Bachelor of Science degree, U.S. Air Force Academy, Colorado Springs, Colo.
- 1990 Fighter Weapons Instructor Course, U.S. Air Force Fighter Weapons School, Nellis AFB, Nev.
- 1995 Air Command and Staff College, by correspondence
- 1996 Armed Forces Staff College, Norfolk, Va.
- 1996 Master's degree in aeronautical science technology, Embry-Riddle Aeronautical University
- 2001 Master's degree in strategic studies, Army War College, Carlisle Barracks, Pa.
- 2004 Senior Executive Fellow, John F. Kennedy School of Government, Harvard University, Cambridge, Mass.
- 2007 Joint Force Air Component Commander Course, Maxwell AFB, Ala.
- 2010 Joint Flag Officer Warfighting Course, Maxwell AFB, Ala.
- 2010 Combined Force Land Component Commander's Course, Carlisle Barracks, Pa.
- 2014 Fellow, Pinnacle Course, National Defense University, Fort Lesley J. McNair, Washington, D.C.

== Assignments ==
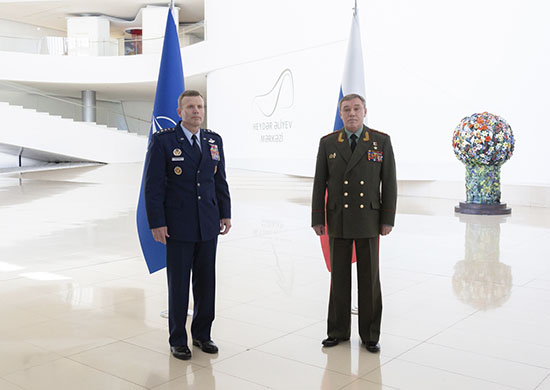
Wolters with Russian Chief of the General Staff Valery Gerasimov in Baku, July 2019.

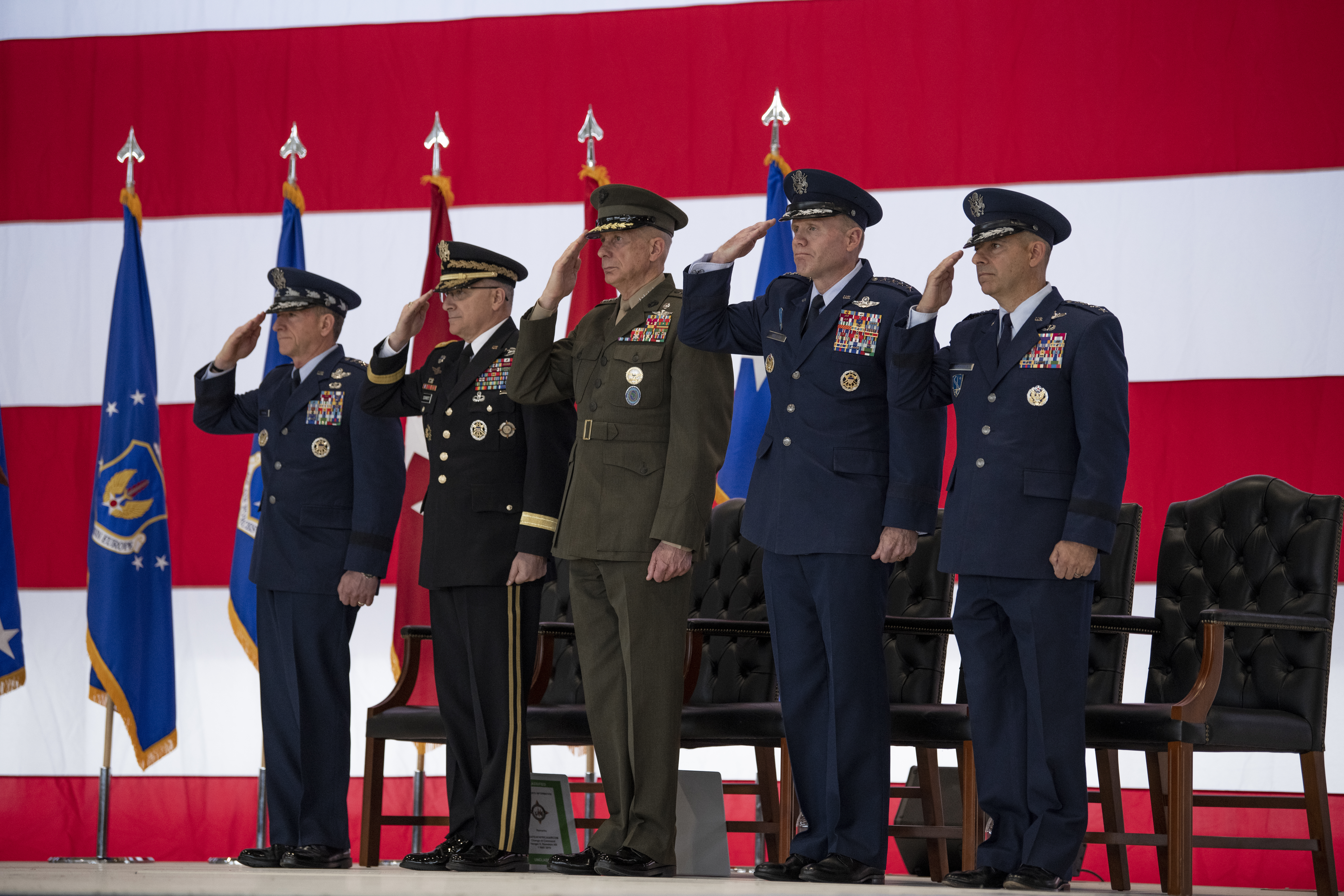
Supreme Allied Commander Europe General Tod D. Wolters with U.S. Air Force Chief of Staff General David L. Goldfein and Commander of USAFE-AFAFRICA General Jeffrey L. Harrigian and Commander of AFRICOM Thomas D. Waldhauser at Ramstein Air Base, Germany, May 1, 2019.

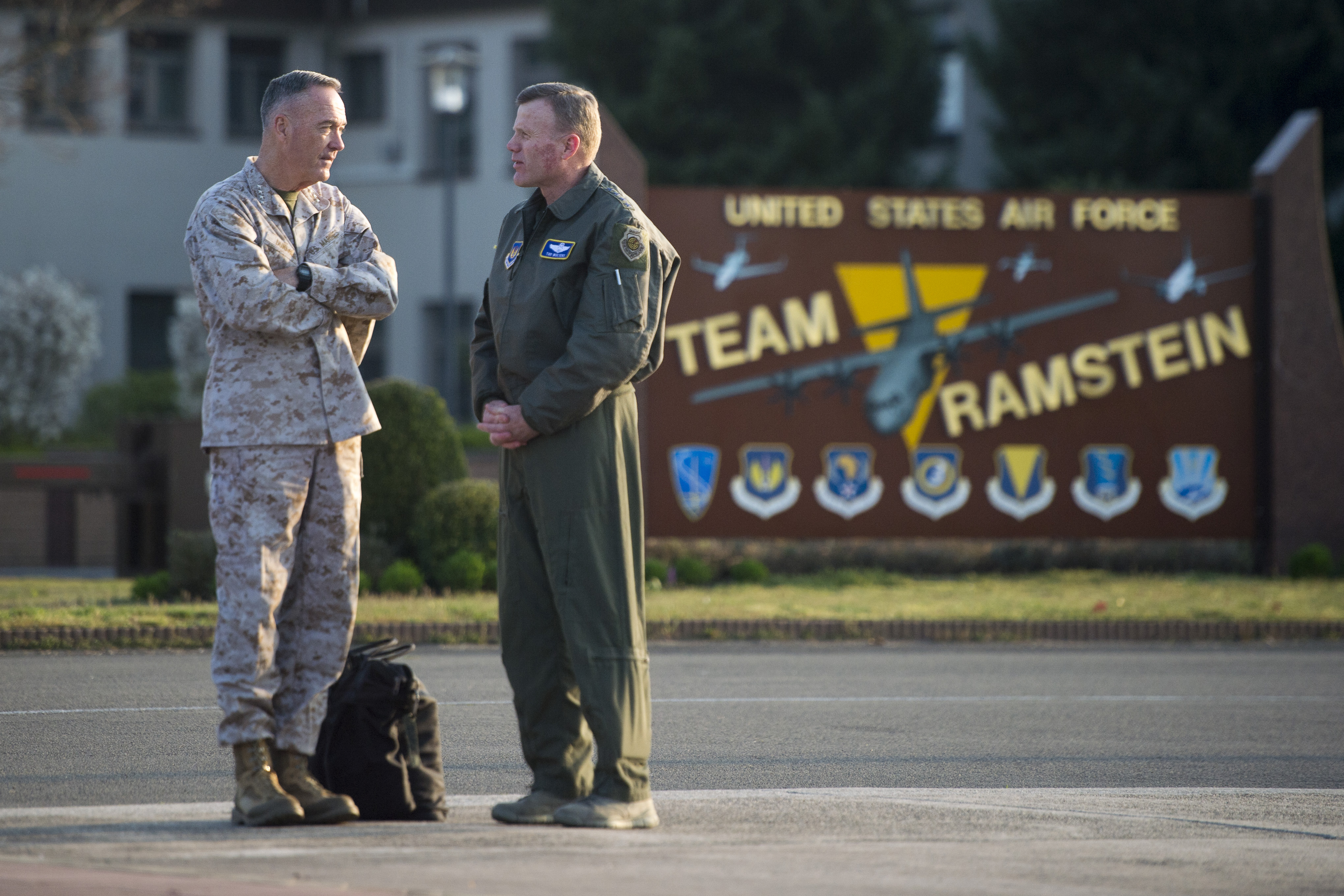
Gen. Joseph Dunford with Gen. Tod Wolters at Ramstein Air Force Base.

1. June 1982 – June 1983, student, undergraduate pilot training, Reese AFB, Texas
2. July 1983 – August 1983, student, fighter lead-in training, Holloman AFB, N.M.
3. September 1983 – November 1983, student, OV-10 Replacement Training Unit, Patrick AFB, Fla.
4. November 1983 – June 1984, OV-10 pilot, 704th Tactical Air Support Squadron, Sembach Air Base, West Germany
5. July 1984 – September 1986, OV-10 instructor pilot and flight examiner, 27th Tactical Air Support Squadron, George AFB, Calif.
6. October 1986 – November 1986, student, fighter lead-in training, Holloman AFB, N.M.
7. December 1986 – April 1987, student, F-15 Replacement Training Unit, Tyndall AFB, Fla.
8. May 1987 – December 1989, F-15 instructor pilot and flight examiner, 53rd Tactical Fighter Squadron, Bitburg AB, West Germany
9. January 1990 – April 1990, student, U.S. Air Force F-15 Fighter Weapons Instructor Course, Nellis AFB, Nev.
10. May 1990 – February 1992, Chief of Weapons and Tactics, 9th Tactical Fighter Squadron, Holloman AFB, N.M.
11. March 1992 – March 1995, assistant operations officer, flight commander and instructor pilot, F-15 Division, U.S. Air Force Fighter Weapons School, Nellis AFB, Nev.
12. April 1995 – March 1997, aide-de-camp to Commander in Chief, U.S. Pacific Command, Camp H.M. Smith, Hawaii
13. April 1997 – December 1997, Chief of Safety, 3rd Wing, Elmendorf AFB, Alaska
14. January 1998 – December 1998, operations officer, 19th Fighter Squadron, Elmendorf AFB, Alaska
15. January 1999 – June 2000, Commander, 19th Fighter Squadron, Elmendorf AFB, Alaska
16. July 2000 – June 2001, student, Army War College, Carlisle Barracks, Pa.
17. June 2001 – April 2002, Chief, Combat Forces Division, Directorate of Operational Requirements, Headquarters U.S. Air Force, Arlington, Va.
18. May 2002 – July 2004, Commander, 1st Operations Group, Langley AFB, Va. (February 2003 – May 2003, Commander, 485th Air Expeditionary Wing, Southwest Asia)
19. July 2004 – April 2006, Commander, 47th Flying Training Wing, Laughlin AFB, Texas
20. June 2006 – March 2008, Commander, 325th Fighter Wing, Tyndall AFB, Fla.
21. March 2008 – March 2009, Deputy Commander, Political-Military Affairs, Combined Security Transition Command-Afghanistan, U.S. Central Command, Kabul, Afghanistan
22. April 2009 – May 2011, Director of Air, Space and Cyberspace Operations, Headquarters Air Force Space Command, Peterson AFB, Colo.
23. May 2011 – May 2012, Commander, 9th Air and Space Expeditionary Task Force - Afghanistan, and Deputy Commander-Air, U.S. Forces-Afghanistan
24. June 2012 – August 2013, director, Legislative Liaison, Office of the Secretary of the Air Force, the Pentagon, Arlington, Va.
25. September 2013 – December 2014, Commander, 12th Air Force, Air Combat Command, and Commander, Air Forces Southern, U.S. Southern Command, Davis-Monthan AFB, Ariz.
26. December 2014 – July 2015, Deputy Chief of Staff for Operations, Headquarters U.S. Air Force, Arlington, Va.
27. July 2015 – August 2016, Director for Operations, Joint Staff, Arlington, Va.
28. August 2016 – April 2019, Commander, U.S. Air Forces in Europe; Commander, U.S. Air Forces Africa; Commander, Allied Air Command, headquartered at Ramstein AB, Germany; and Director, Joint Air Power Competency Centre, Kalkar, Germany
29. May 2019 – July 2022, Commander, U.S. European Command, Stuttgart-Vaihingen, Germany; and Supreme Allied Commander Europe, Mons, Belgium

== Summary of joint assignments ==
1. April 1995 – March 1997, aide-de-camp to Commander in Chief, U.S. Pacific Command, Camp H.M. Smith, Hawaii, as a major.
2. March 2008 – March 2009, Deputy Commander, Political-Military Affairs, Combined Security Transition Command-Afghanistan, U.S. Central Command, Kabul, Afghanistan, as a brigadier general.
3. May 2011 – May 2012, Commander, 9th Air and Space Expeditionary Task Force – Afghanistan, and Deputy Commander-Air, U.S. Forces-Afghanistan, as a major general.
4. September 2013 – December 2014, Commander, Air Forces Southern, U.S. Southern Command, Davis-Monthan AFB, Ariz., as a lieutenant general.
5. July 2015 – August 2016, Director for Operations, Joint Staff, Arlington, Va., as a lieutenant general.
6. May 2019 – July 2022, Commander, U.S. European Command, Stuttgart-Vaihingen, Germany; and Supreme Allied Commander Europe, Mons, Belgium, as a general.

== Flight information ==
Rating: Command Pilot
Flight hours: more than 4,990
Aircraft flown: F-15C, F-22, OV-10, T-38, and A-10

== Awards and decorations ==

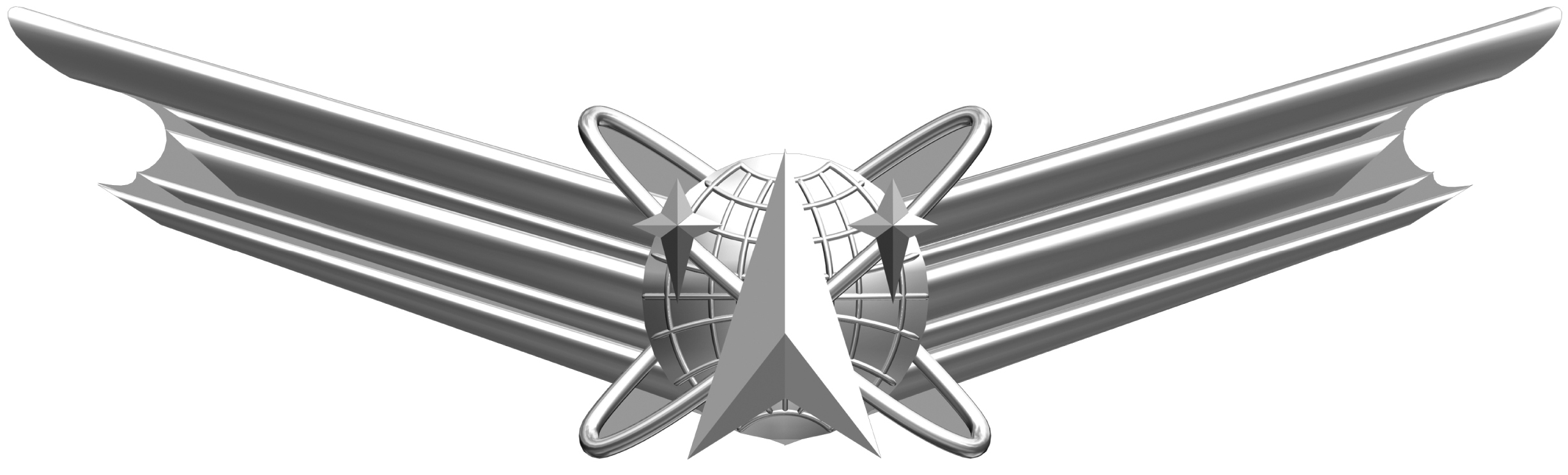

Badge	US Air Force Command Pilot Badge		
Badge	Basic Space Operations Badge		
1st row	Defense Distinguished Service Medal with two bronze oak leaf clusters		Air Force Distinguished Service Medal with oak leaf cluster
2nd row	Defense Superior Service Medal	Legion of Merit with two bronze oak leaf clusters	Bronze Star Medal with oak leaf cluster
3rd row	Defense Meritorious Service Medal	Meritorious Service Medal with two bronze oak leaf clusters	Air Medal with oak leaf cluster
4th row	Aerial Achievement Medal with three oak leaf clusters	Joint Service Commendation Medal	Air Force Commendation Medal with two bronze oak leaf clusters
5th row	Air Force Achievement Medal	Air Force Combat Action Medal	Joint Meritorious Unit Award with oak leaf cluster
6th row	Air Force Outstanding Unit Award with "V" device and three bronze oak leaf clusters	Air Force Outstanding Unit Award (second ribbon to denote fifth award)	Army Superior Unit Award
7th row	Air Force Organizational Excellence Award with oak leaf cluster	Combat Readiness Medal with oak leaf cluster	National Defense Service Medal with one bronze service star
8th row	Armed Forces Expeditionary Medal	Southwest Asia Service Medal with bronze service star	Afghanistan Campaign Medal with one bronze service star
9th row	Global War on Terrorism Expeditionary Medal	Global War on Terrorism Service Medal	Air Force Overseas Short Tour Service Ribbon
10th row	Air Force Overseas Long Tour Service Ribbon with two oak leaf clusters	Air Force Expeditionary Service Ribbon with gold frame and one bronze oak leaf cluster	Air Force Longevity Service Award with one silver and three bronze oak leaf clusters
11th row	Air Force Longevity Service Award (second ribbon to denote tenth award)	Small Arms Expert Marksmanship Ribbon with bronze service star	Air Force Training Ribbon
12th row	NATO Medal for service with ISAF	SICOFAA Legion of Merit, Grand Cross	Kuwait Liberation Medal (Kuwait)
Badge	United States European Command Badge		
Badge	SACEUR Badge		
Badge	Joint Chiefs of Staff Identification Badge		
Badge	Headquarters Air Force Badge		

- He is also a recipient of the Weapons School Graduate Patch.

== Effective dates of promotion ==
Promotions
Insignia	Rank	Date
	General	August 11, 2016
	Lieutenant General	September 24, 2013
	Major General	August 2, 2011
	Brigadier General	November 2, 2007
	Colonel	July 1, 2002
	Lieutenant Colonel	January 1, 1998
	Major	March 1, 1994
	Captain	June 2, 1986
	First Lieutenant	June 2, 1984
	Second Lieutenant	June 2, 1982

== See also ==
- List of commanders of USAFE

Military offices
Preceded by Daniel P. Woodward	Commander of the 47th Flying Training Wing; 2004–2006	Succeeded by Edward M. Minahan
Preceded by Jack B. Egginton	Commander of the 325th Fighter Wing; 2006–2008	Succeeded by Darryl Roberson
Preceded by ???	Deputy Commander for Political-Military Affairs of the Combined Security Transition Command – Afghanistan; 2008–2009	Succeeded by Carlton D. Everhart II
Preceded by Stanley T. Kresge	Director of Air, Space, and Cyberspace Operations of the Air Force Space Command; 2009–2011	Succeeded by David D. Thompson
Preceded by Charles W. Lyon	Commander of the 9th Air and Space Expeditionary Task Force-Afghanistan; 2011–2012	Succeeded by Kenneth S. Wilsbach
Preceded by Lori Robinson	Legislative Liaison of the United States Air Force; 2012–2013	Succeeded by Thomas W. Bergeson
Preceded by Robin Rand	Commander of the Twelfth Air Force; 2013–2014	Succeeded by Mark Nowland
Preceded by Burton M. Field	Deputy Chief of Staff for Operations of the United States Air Force; 2014–2015	Succeeded by John W. Raymond
Preceded by William C. Mayville Jr.	Director for Operations of the Joint Staff; 2015–2016	Succeeded by John L. Dolan
Preceded by Curtis M. Scaparrotti	Commander of the United States European Command and Supreme Allied Commander Europe; 2019–2022	Succeeded by Christopher G. Cavoli
