= John L. Dolan =

US Air Force officer (born c. 1964)

Lieutenant General John L. Dolan
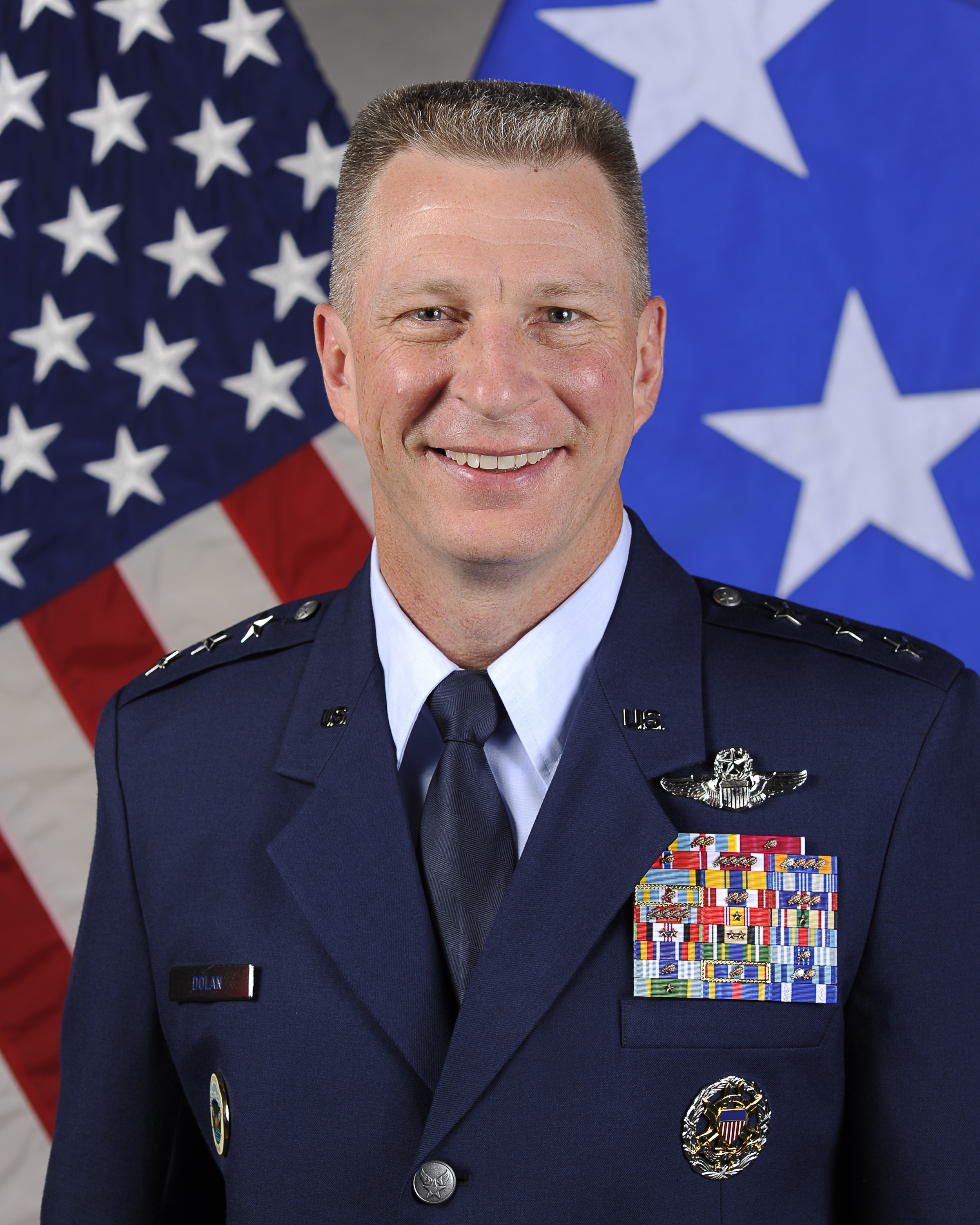
- Lieutenant General John L. Dolan, USAF, c. 2015
- Born: c. 1964 (age 61–62)
- Education: University of Northern Colorado (BS); Embry-Riddle (MS)
- Military career
- Allegiance: United States
- Branch: United States Air Force
- Service years: 1986–2018
- Rank: Lieutenant general
- Commands: United States Forces Japan; 5th Air Force; 451st Air Expeditionary Wing; Kandahar Air Base; 8th Fighter Wing; 16th Weapons Squadron
- Awards: Defense Distinguished Service Medal (2); Defense Superior Service Medal (3); Legion of Merit (2); Bronze Star Medal; Meritorious Service Medal (5); Air Medal (9); Aerial Achievement Medal; Air Force Commendation Medal; Air Force Achievement Medal

Lieutenant General John L. Dolan (born 1964) is a retired United States Air Force officer who last served as the director for operations (J-3) on the Joint Chiefs of Staff from August 2016 to October 2018. Before that, he served as the commander of United States Forces Japan and commander of 5th Air Force from June 2015 to August 2016.

Dolan received his commission in 1986 through the Colorado State University’s ROTC program. He has held various squadron, wing, headquarters, and combatant command level positions in multiple overseas and deployed assignments. His staff duties included serving on Capitol Hill and directly for the Chairman of the Joint Chiefs of Staff and the Secretary of the Air Force. His commands include the U.S. Air Force F-16 Weapons School, 8th Fighter Wing, 451st Air Expeditionary Wing, Kandahar Air Base (NATO), 5th Air Force and United States Forces Japan.

Dolan is a command pilot with more than 4,000 flying hours, including more than 200 combat missions during Operations Iraqi Freedom, Enduring Freedom, and Northern Watch.

== Education ==
- 1986 Bachelors of Science, Chemistry, University of Northern Colorado, Greeley
- 1993 Squadron Officer School, Maxwell AFB, Alabama
- 1996 Masters of Aeronautical Science and Technology, Embry Riddle University, Florida
- 2001 Air Command and Staff College, Maxwell AFB, Alabama
- 2006 National War College, Fort Lesley J. McNair, Washington, D.C.
- 2014 Joint Force Air Component Commander Course, Maxwell AFB, Alabama
- 2016 Leadership at the Peak, Center for Creative Leadership, Colorado Springs, Colorado

== Military assignments ==
- October 1986 – August 1987, student, Undergraduate Pilot Training, Reese AFB, Texas
- September 1987 – September 1988, student, F-16 Replacement Training Unit, MacDill AFB, Florida
- October 1988 – December 1992, F-16 Instructor Pilot, Flight Examiner, Assistant Chief of Standards and Evaluation, Misawa AB, Japan
- January 1993 – June 1993, student, U.S. Air Force Weapons Instructor Course, Nellis AFB, Nevada
- July 1993 – June 1996, F-16 Weapons Officer and Flight Commander, Spangdahlem AB, Germany
- July 1996 – June 1999, F-16 U.S. Air Force Weapons School Instructor, Flight Commander, Chief of Wing Scheduling, Assistant Operations Officer, Nellis AFB, Nevada
- July 1999 – June 2000, chief of safety, inspector general, 8th Fighter Wing, Kunsan AB, South Korea
- July 2000 – June 2001, student, Air Command and Staff College, Maxwell AFB, Alabama
- July 2001 – June 2002, chief of F-22 Avionics and System Effectiveness, Headquarters Air Combat Command, Langley AFB, Virginia
- July 2002 – June 2005, special assistant to the commandant of U.S. Air Force Weapons School, Commander, 16th Weapons Squadron, Nellis AFB, Nevada
- August 2005 – June 2006, student, National War College, Fort Lesley J. McNair, Washington, D.C.
- July 2006 – March 2007, lead, fixed wing applications, Force Applications, J-8, the Pentagon, Arlington, Virginia
- March 2007 – July 2008, chief of Force Applications Engagement Division, J-8, the Pentagon, Arlington, Virginia
- July 2008 – July 2009, vice commander, 332nd Air Expeditionary Wing, Joint Base Balad, Iraq
- July 2009 – May 2010, chief of Senate legislative liaison, Office of the Secretary of the Air Force, the Pentagon, Arlington, Virginia
- May 2010 – May 2011, commander of 8th Fighter Wing, Kunsan AB, South Korea
- May 2011 – October 2012, deputy director, legislative liaison, Office of the Secretary of the Air Force, the Pentagon, Arlington, Virginia
- November 2012 – November 2013, commander, 451st Air Expeditionary Wing and Kandahar Airfield (NATO), Kandahar, Afghanistan
- January 2014 – May 2014, assistant deputy commander of U.S. Air Forces Central Command and Assistant Vice Commander, 9th Air Expeditionary Task Force, Shaw AFB, South Carolina
- May 2014 – May 2015, chief of staff, United States Pacific Command, Camp H.M. Smith, Hawaii
- June 2015 – August 2016, commander of U.S. Forces Japan and commander of 5th Air Force, Yokota AB, Japan
- August 2016 – October 2018, director for operations (J-3), Joint Staff, the Pentagon, Arlington, Virginia

== Effective dates of promotion ==
Insignia	Rank	Date of rank
	Second lieutenant	14 June 1986
	First lieutenant	9 August 1988
	Captain	9 August 1990
	Major	1 May 1998
	Lieutenant colonel	1 November 2002
	Colonel	1 September 2007
	Brigadier general	2 May 2012
	Major general	2 March 2015
	Lieutenant general	5 June 2015

Military offices
Preceded by Tod D. Wolters	Director of Operations of the Joint Staff; 2016–2018	Succeeded by Michael M. Gilday
