= Herbert J. Carlisle =

United States Air Force general (born 1956)

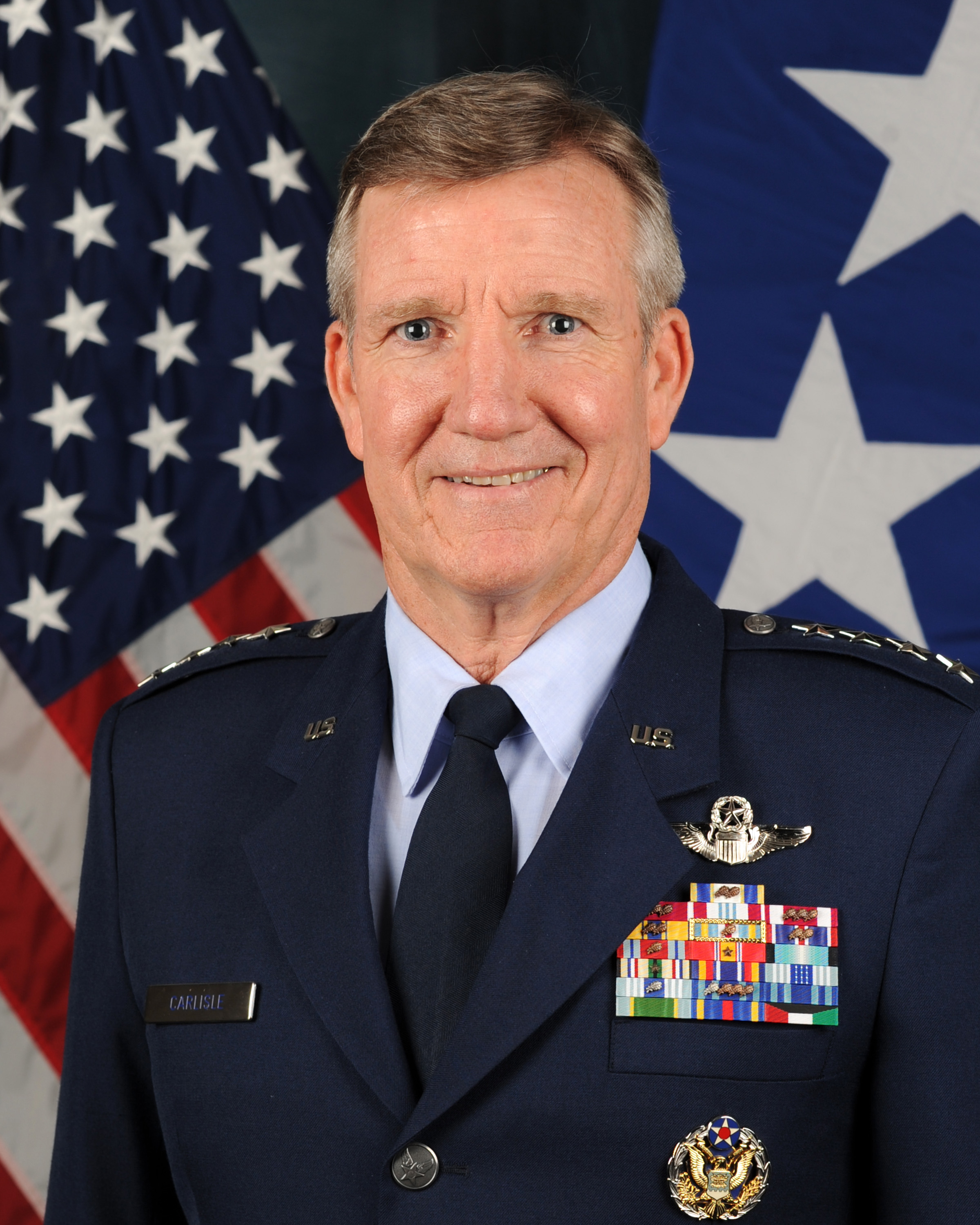
- General Herbert J. Carlisle in 2015
- Born: February 7, 1956 (age 70)
- Military career
- Allegiance: United States
- Branch: United States Air Force
- Service years: 1978–2017
- Rank: General
- Nickname: Hawk
- Commands: Air Combat Command; Pacific Air Forces; 13th Air Force; 3rd Wing; 33rd Fighter Wing; 1st Operations Group; 54th Fighter Squadron
- Conflicts: Gulf War
- Awards: Air Force Distinguished Service Medal (3); Legion of Merit (4); Defense Meritorious Service Medal

Herbert Jay Carlisle (born February 7, 1956) is a retired United States Air Force four-star general who last served as the commander of Air Combat Command, at Langley Field, Joint Base Langley–Eustis, Virginia. He also previously served as the commander of Pacific Air Forces while concurrently serving as air component commander for United States Pacific Command and executive director of Pacific Air Combat Operations Staff, Joint Base Pearl Harbor–Hickam, Hawaii. He officially retired from the Air Force on May 1, 2017, with 39 years of service.

Originally from El Cajon, California Carlisle graduated from Granite Hills High School in 1974, and continued on to graduate from the United States Air Force Academy in 1978. He has served in various operational and staff assignments throughout the Air Force and commanded a fighter squadron, an operations group, two wings and a numbered air force. The general is a joint service officer and served as the chief of air operations, United States Central Command Forward in Riyadh, Saudi Arabia. During that time he participated in Operation Restore Hope in Somalia. He also participated in Operation Provide Comfort in Turkey as Commander of the 54th Fighter Squadron, and Operation Noble Eagle as Command 33rd Fighter Wing. Carlisle served on the Air Staff as director, operational planning, policy and strategy, deputy chief of staff for air, space and information operations, plans and requirements, and twice in the Plans and Programs Directorate. He also served as the deputy director, and later director, of legislative liaison at the Office of the Secretary of the Air Force, and commander of 13th Air Force, Joint Base Pearl Harbor–Hickam, Hawaii.

Carlisle is a command pilot with more than 3,600 flying hours in the AT-38, YF-110, YF-113, T-38, F-15A/B/C/D, F-15E, and C-17A.

== Education ==
- 1978 Bachelor of Science degree in math, U.S. Air Force Academy, Colorado Springs, Colo.
- 1982 Squadron Officer School, Maxwell AFB, Ala.
- 1984 F-15 Fighter Weapons Instructor Course, Nellis AFB, Nev.
- 1988 Master's degree in business administration, Golden Gate University, San Francisco, Calif.
- 1991 Air Command and Staff College, Maxwell AFB, Ala.
- 1993 Armed Forces Staff College, Norfolk, Va.
- 1997 Army War College, Carlisle Barracks, Pa.
- 2002 National Security Management Course, Syracuse University, N.Y.
- 2005 Seminar XXI – International Relations, Massachusetts Institute of Technology, Cambridge
- 2007 Executive Course on National and International Security, George Washington University, Washington, D.C.

== Assignments ==
- May 1978 – November 1979, student, undergraduate pilot training, Williams AFB, Ariz.
- November 1979 – January 1984, instructor pilot and flight examiner, 525th Tactical Fighter Squadron, Bitburg Air Base, West Germany
- January 1984 – January 1986, chief of weapons and tactics, 9th Tactical Fighter Squadron, Holloman AFB, N.M.
- January 1986 – April 1988, chief of weapons and tactics and flight commander, 4477th Test and Evaluation Squadron, Nellis AFB, Nev.
- April 1988 – July 1990, director, F-15 Multistage Improvement Program, Tactical Fighter Weapons Center, Nellis AFB, Nev.
- July 1990 – June 1991, student, Air Command and Staff College, Maxwell AFB, Ala.
- June 1991 – July 1993, chief of Air Operations-Forward Element, Joint Operations Directorate, U.S. Central Command, Riyadh, Saudi Arabia
- July 1993 – June 1995, operations officer, 19th Fighter Squadron, Elmendorf AFB, Alaska
- June 1995 – July 1996, commander, 54th Fighter Squadron, Elmendorf AFB, Alaska
- July 1996 – June 1997, student, Army War College, Carlisle Barracks, Pa.
- June 1997 – June 1998, deputy commander, 18th Operations Group, Kadena AB, Japan
- June 1998 – March 2000, commander, 1st Operations Group, Langley AFB, Va.
- March 2000 – February 2001, chief of Combat Forces Division, Directorate of Programs, Headquarters U.S. Air Force, Washington, D.C.
- March 2001 – February 2003, commander, 33rd Fighter Wing, Eglin AFB, Fla.
- March 2003 – August 2004, chief of Program Integration Division, Directorate of Programs, Headquarters U.S. Air Force, Washington, D.C.
- September 2004 – April 2005, deputy director, legislative liaison, Office of the Secretary of the Air Force, Washington, D.C.
- May 2005 – June 2007, commander, 3rd Wing, Elmendorf AFB, Alaska
- June 2007 – November 2007, director of operational planning, policy and strategy, deputy chief of staff for air, space and information operations, plans and requirements, Headquarters U.S. Air Force, Washington, D.C.
- November 2007 – August 2009, director, legislative liaison, Office of the Secretary of the Air Force, Headquarters U.S. Air Force, Washington, D.C.
- September 2009 – December 2010, commander, 13th Air Force, Hickam AFB, Hawaii
- January 2011 – July 2012, deputy chief of staff for operations, plans and requirements, headquarters U.S. Air Force, Washington, D.C.
- August 2012 – September 2014, commander, Pacific Air Forces; Air Component Commander for U.S. Pacific Command; and executive director, Pacific Air Combat Operations Staff, Joint Base Pearl Harbor–Hickam.
- October 2014 – March 2017, commander, Air Combat Command, Langley AFB, Va.

== Flight information ==
Rating: Command pilot
Flight hours: More than 3,600
Aircraft flown: AT-38, YF-110, YF-113, T-38, F-15A/B/C/D, and C-17A

== Awards and decorations ==
US Air Force Command Pilot Badge
Headquarters Air Force Badge

Air Force Distinguished Service Medal with two bronze oak leaf clusters
Legion of Merit with three bronze oak leaf clusters
Defense Meritorious Service Medal
Meritorious Service Medal with three bronze oak leaf clusters
Air Force Commendation Medal with two bronze oak leaf clusters
Joint Meritorious Unit Award with bronze oak leaf cluster
Air Force Outstanding Unit Award with two bronze oak leaf clusters
Air Force Organizational Excellence Award
Combat Readiness Medal with bronze oak leaf cluster
National Defense Service Medal with bronze service star
Antarctica Service Medal
Southwest Asia Service Medal with one bronze service star
Global War on Terrorism Service Medal
Air Force Overseas Short Tour Service Ribbon
Air Force Overseas Long Tour Service Ribbon with one silver oak leaf cluster
Air Force Longevity Service Award with silver and three bronze oak leaf clusters
Air Force Longevity Service Award (second ribbon to denote tenth award)
Small Arms Expert Marksmanship Ribbon
Air Force Training Ribbon
Order of National Security Merit, Tong-il Medal (Republic of Korea)
Kuwait Liberation Medal (Kuwait)

- General Carlisle also received a badge from Thailand.

== Effective dates of promotion ==
Promotions
Insignia	Rank	Date
	General	August 2, 2012
	Lieutenant general	September 2, 2009
	Major general	December 10, 2007
	Brigadier general	August 1, 2005
	Colonel	September 1, 1998
	Lieutenant colonel	June 1, 1993
	Major	March 1, 1989
	Captain	May 31, 1982
	First lieutenant	May 31, 1980
	Second lieutenant	May 31, 1978

Military offices
Preceded by Gilmary M. Hostage III	Commander of the Air Combat Command; 2014–2017	Succeeded by James M. Holmes
