= Steven L. Kwast =

US Air Force general

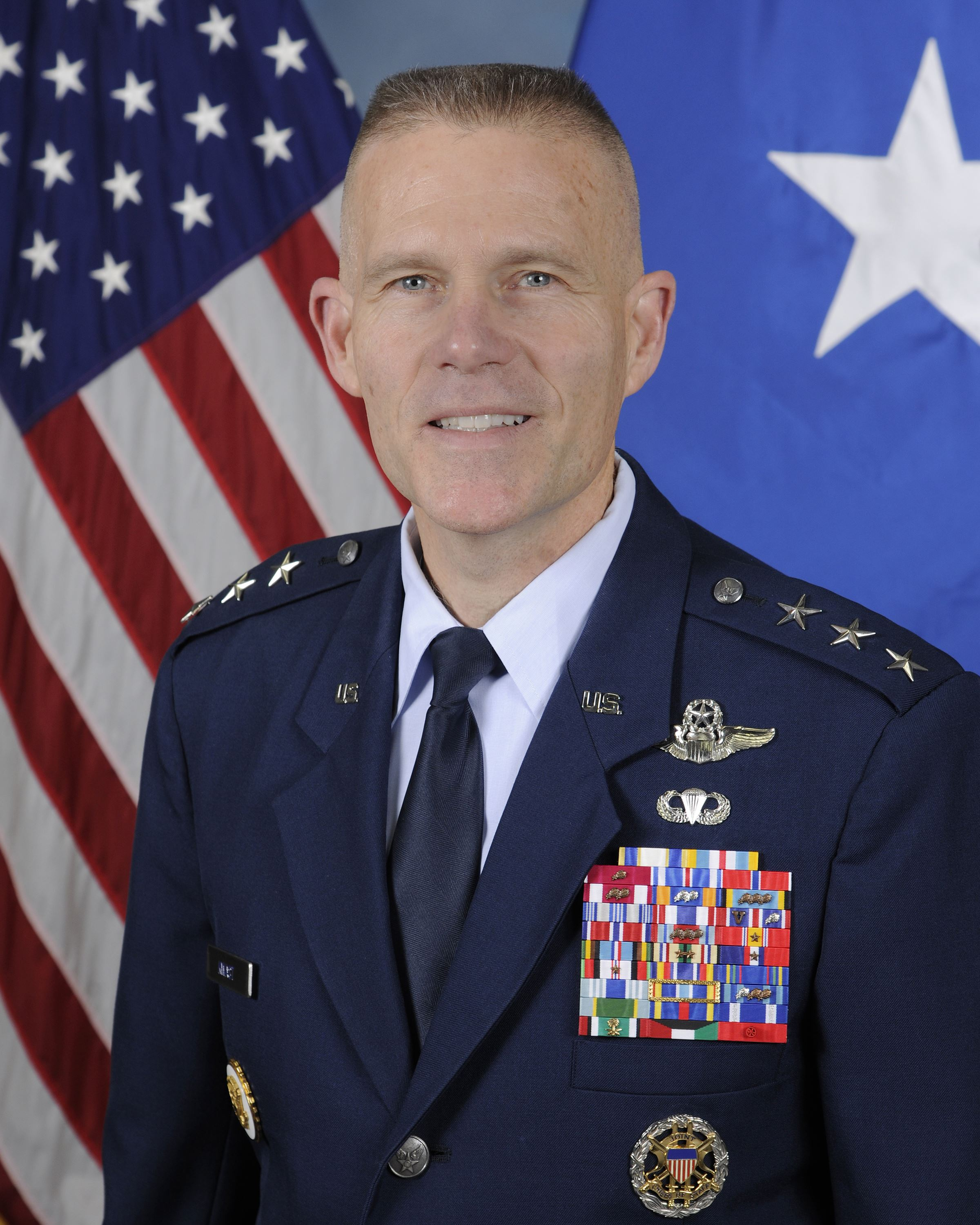
- Lieutenant General Kwast
- Born: Stockton, California, U.S.
- Military career
- Allegiance: United States
- Branch: United States Air Force
- Service years: 1986–2019
- Rank: Lieutenant General
- Commands: Air Education and Training Command; Air University; 455th Air Expeditionary Wing; 4th Fighter Wing; 47th Operations Group
- Conflicts: Gulf War; War in Afghanistan
- Awards: Air Force Distinguished Service Medal; Defense Superior Service Medal; Legion of Merit (2); Distinguished Flying Cross; Bronze Star Medal

Steven Lloyd Kwast is a retired United States Air Force lieutenant general. He last served as commander of Air Education and Training Command, Joint Base San Antonio-Randolph, Texas. In that role, he was responsible for the recruiting, training and education of Air Force personnel. The command includes Air Force Recruiting Service, two numbered air forces and Air University. The command operates more than 1,400 trainer, fighter and mobility aircraft, 23 wings, 10 bases and five geographically separated groups. It trains more than 293,000 students per year with approximately 60,000 active-duty, Reserve, Guard, civilian and contractor personnel.

Raised in Cameroon, Kwast was commissioned into the Air Force upon graduation from the U.S. Air Force Academy in 1986. After completing a Masters of Public Policy from Harvard Kennedy School at Harvard University, he was assigned to undergraduate pilot training and earned his pilot wings in June 1989. Kwast subsequently completed F-15E Strike Eagle training at Luke Air Force Base, Arizona. General Kwast has served as military aide to the United States Vice President and completed a National Defense Fellowship with the Institute for the Study of Conflict, Ideology and Policy at Boston University, Massachusetts.

Kwast commanded at the squadron, group and wing levels, including the 47th Operations Group at Laughlin Air Force Base, Texas, and the 4th Fighter Wing at Seymour Johnson AFB, North Carolina. He also served as the deputy director for Colonel Matters, Air Force Senior Leader Management Office, Washington, D.C., and as the commander, 455th Air Expeditionary Wing, Bagram Airfield, Afghanistan. General Kwast was the deputy director for Politico-Military Affairs for Europe, NATO and Russia, Strategic Plans and Policy Directorate, Joint Staff, the Pentagon, Arlington, Va. Prior to his last assignment, General Kwast was the Commander and President, Air University, Maxwell AFB, Alabama. He has more than 3,300 flying hours, including more than 650 combat hours during operations Desert Shield, Desert Storm, Southern Watch, Allied Force and Enduring Freedom.

In May 2025, reports indicated General Kwast was likely to be nominated as the next NASA Administrator, following the withdrawal of Jared Isaacman from the position by President Donald Trump. Kwast is expected to support dual-use programs such as Golden Dome, saying in 2020,

"The strategy is to build the Space Force with the profit of the marketplaces that you dominate. You've got partners in civil society, Elon Musk, Jeff Bezos."

== Dates of promotion ==
Kwast was nominated for appointment to the rank of lieutenant general by the president on August 1, 2014. He was promoted to Lieutenant General November 10, 2014. Kwast was nominated for appointment to the rank of major general by the president on May 3, 2011. He was promoted to major general May 4, 2012. On July 31, 2009 Kwast was promoted to the grade of brigadier general at Bagram Airfield, Afghanistan.

Promotions
Lieutenant General	November 10, 2014
Major General	May 4, 2012
Brigadier General	July 31, 2009
Colonel	August 1, 2003
Lieutenant Colonel	July 1, 1999
Major	August 1, 1996
Captain	May 28, 1990
First Lieutenant	May 28, 1988
Second Lieutenant	May 28, 1986

== Education ==
- 1986 Bachelor's degree in astronautical engineering, U.S. Air Force Academy, Colorado Springs, Colo.
- 1988 Master's degree in public policy, Harvard Kennedy School Harvard University, Mass.
- 1993 Squadron Officer School, Maxwell Air Force Base, Ala.
- 1994 Fighter Weapons School, Nellis AFB, Nev.
- 1997 Air Command and Staff College, Maxwell Air Force Base, Ala.
- 1999 Air War College, by correspondence
- 2003 National Defense Fellowship, Boston University, Mass.
- 2006 Massachusetts Institute of Technology (MIT), Seminar XXI
- 2008 Air Force Enterprise Leadership Seminar, University of North Carolina at Chapel Hill, N.C.

== Assignments ==
- August 1986 – June 1988, AFIT student, Harvard Kennedy School Harvard University, Cambridge, Mass.
- June 1988 – June 1989, student, undergraduate pilot training, Williams AFB, Ariz.
- June 1989 – May 1990, student, F-15E Fighter Training Unit, Luke AFB, Ariz.
- May 1990 – August 1996, war plans officer, weapons officer, and Chief of Weapons, 336th Fighter Squadron, 4th Fighter Wing, Seymour Johnson AFB, N.C.
- August 1996 – June 1997, student, Air Command and Staff College, Maxwell AFB, Ala.
- June 1997 – August 1999, military aide to the Vice President of the United States, the White House, Washington D.C.
- August 1999 – June 2002, Assistant Operations Officer, Director of Operations, and Commander, 492d Fighter Squadron, Royal Air Force Lakenheath, United Kingdom
- June 2002 – June 2003, National Defense Fellow, Institute for the Study of Conflict, Ideology, and Policy, Boston University, Mass.
- September 2003 – February 2005, Commander, 47th Operations Group, Laughlin Air Force Base, Texas
- February 2005 – September 2006, Deputy Director for Colonel Matters, Air Force Senior Leader Management Office, Washington, D.C.
- September 2006 – September 2008, Commander, 4th Fighter Wing, Seymour Johnson AFB, N.C.
- September 2008 – April 2009, Deputy Director of Requirements, Headquarters Air Combat Command, Langley AFB, Va.
- April 2009 – April 2010, Commander, 455th Air Expeditionary Wing, Bagram Airfield, Afghanistan
- June 2010 – March 2012, Deputy Director for Politico-Military Affairs for Europe, NATO and Russia, Strategic Plans and Policy Directorate, Joint Staff, the Pentagon, Arlington, Va.
- March 2012 – January 2013, Director of Requirements, Air Combat Command, Joint Base Langley-Eustis, Va.
- January 2013 – January 2014, Director, Air Force Quadrennial Defense Review, Office of the Air Force Assistant Vice Chief of Staff, Headquarters U.S. Air Force, Washington, D.C.
- February 2014 – November 2014, Commander, Curtis E. LeMay Center for Doctrine Development and Education and Vice Commander, Air University, Maxwell AFB, Ala.
- November 2014 – November 2017, Commander and President, Air University, Maxwell AFB, Ala.
- November 2017 – July 2019, Commander, Air Education and Training Command, Joint Base San Antonio, Texas

== Awards and decorations ==
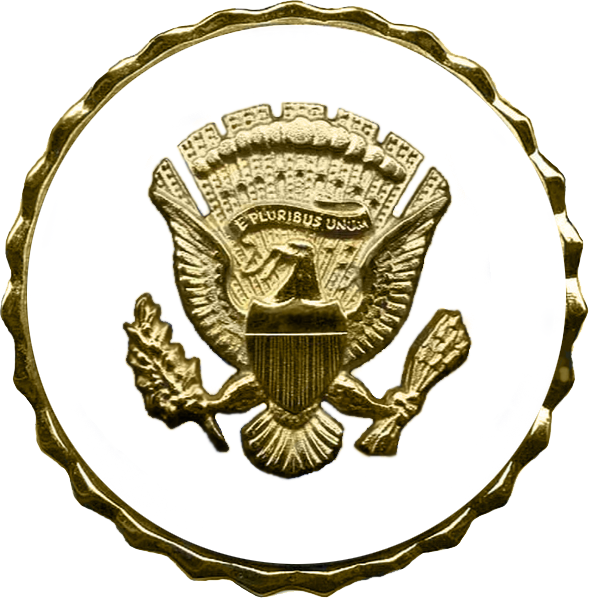
US Air Force Command Pilot Badge
Basic Parachutist Badge
Office of the Joint Chiefs of Staff Identification Badge
Vice Presidential Service Badge

Air Force Distinguished Service Medal
Defense Superior Service Medal
Legion of Merit with one bronze oak leaf cluster
Distinguished Flying Cross
Bronze Star Medal
Meritorious Service Medal with two oak leaf clusters
Air Medal with two silver oak leaf clusters
Aerial Achievement Medal with three oak leaf clusters
Air Force Achievement Medal
Air Force Meritorious Unit Award
Air Force Outstanding Unit Award with "V" Device and silver oak leaf cluster
Air Force Organizational Excellence Award
Combat Readiness Medal with three oak leaf clusters
National Defense Service Medal with one bronze service star
Armed Forces Expeditionary Medal
Southwest Asia Service Medal with two bronze service stars
Kosovo Campaign Medal with service star
Afghanistan Campaign Medal with service star
Global War on Terrorism Service Medal
Nuclear Deterrence Operations Service Medal
Air Force Overseas Long Tour Service Ribbon
Air Force Expeditionary Service Ribbon with gold frame
Air Force Longevity Service Award with one silver and two bronze oak leaf clusters
Small Arms Expert Marksmanship Ribbon
Air Force Training Ribbon
Legion of Honour, Officer (France)
NATO Medal for Service with ISAF
Kuwait Liberation Medal (Saudi Arabia)
Kuwait Liberation Medal (Kuwait)

== Other achievements ==
- 1989 Commander's Trophy, Air Training Command
- 1994 Outstanding Graduate, USAF Fighter Weapons School
- 1995 Robbie Risner Award

Military offices
Preceded by Darryl Roberson	Commander, Air Education and Training Command; 2017–2019	Succeeded by Marshall B. Webb
Preceded by David S. Fadok	Commander, Air University; 2014–2017	Succeeded by Anthony J. Cotton
Preceded by Walter D. Givhan	Commander, LeMay Center for Doctrine Development and Education; February – November 2014	Succeeded by Jill E. Singleton
Preceded by James M. Holmes	Commander, 455th Air Expeditionary Wing; 2009–2010	Succeeded by Jack L. Briggs II
