= William C. Mayville Jr. =

US Army general

William C. Mayville, Jr.
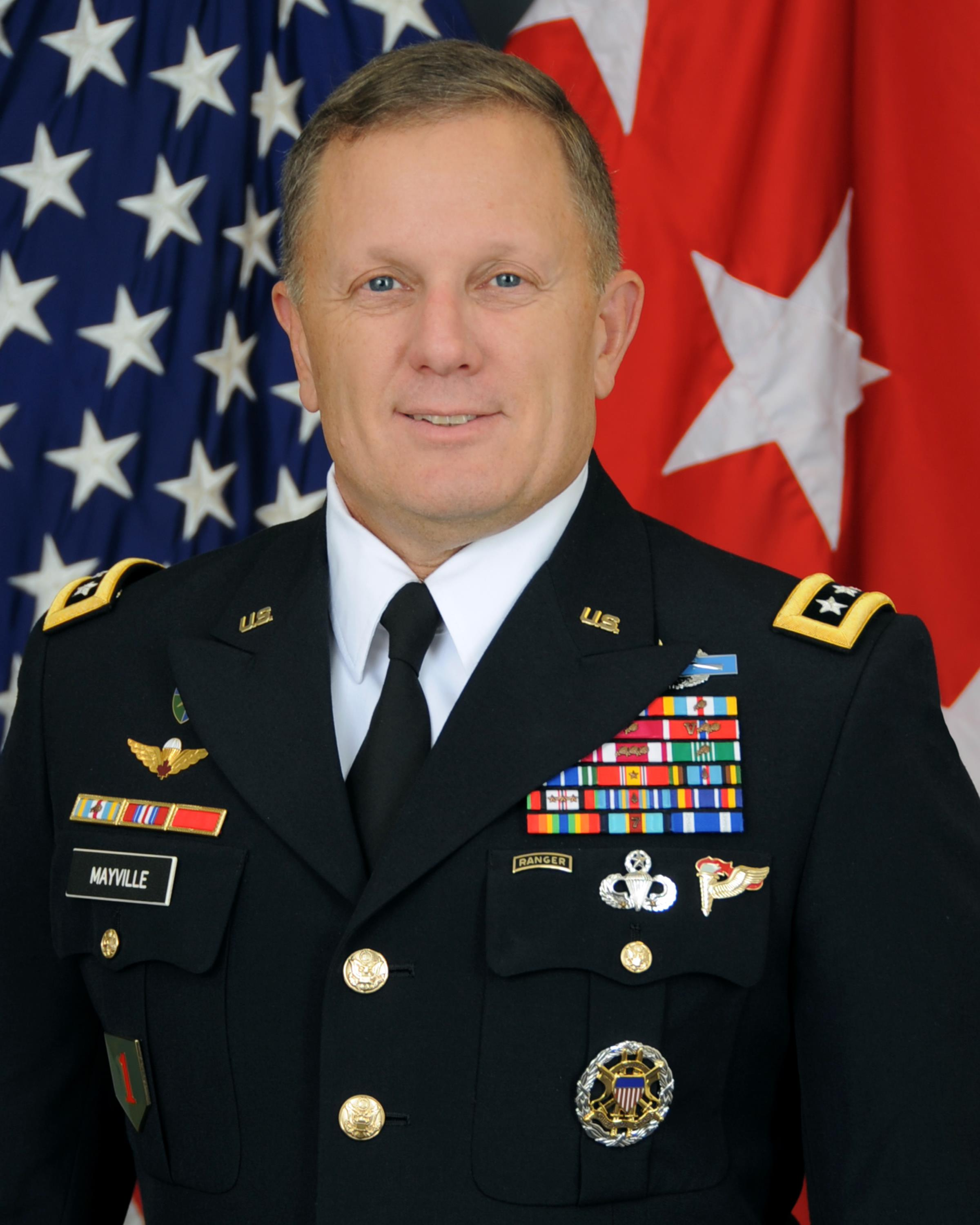
- Military career
- Allegiance: United States
- Branch: United States Army
- Service years: 1982–2018
- Rank: Lieutenant General
- Commands: 1st Infantry Division; 173d Airborne Brigade; 1st Battalion, 504th Parachute Infantry Regiment
- Conflicts: Iraq War; War in Afghanistan
- Awards: Army Distinguished Service Medal; Defense Superior Service Medal (2); Legion of Merit (2); Bronze Star Medal (3)

William Charles Mayville Jr. is a retired United States Army lieutenant general who served as Deputy Commander, United States Cyber Command. After his military retirement, Mayville joined Korn Ferry consulting firm.

== Education ==
Mayville graduated from the United States Military Academy in 1982, branched Infantry.

== Military career ==
He began his career as a Weapons Platoon Leader, Rifle Platoon Leader, and Company Executive Officer with the 1st Battalion, 75th Rangers at Hunter Army Airfield in Savannah, Georgia.

Following attendance at the Infantry Officers Advance Course, Mayville served as a Maintenance Officer and Company Commander in the 1st Battalion (Mechanized), 7th Infantry Regiment, 3d Infantry Division. He served as the Brigade Adjutant for the 3d Brigade, 82d Airborne Division and later, the Battalion Operations Officer for 3d Battalion, 505th Parachute Infantry Regiment. He subsequently served in the 75th Ranger Regiment as the Logistics Officer (S‐4) and Regimental Executive Officer before taking command of the 1st Battalion, 504th Parachute Infantry Regiment, 82d Airborne Division from 1997 to 1999. Following battalion command, he was assigned as Chief of Plans and Training, J3 Operations, at the Joint Special Operations Command.

In June 2002, Mayville assumed command of the 173d Airborne Brigade in Vicenza, Italy and commanded the brigade during its airborne assault in northern Iraq as part of Operation Iraqi Freedom in March 2003. Following brigade command, he served as Chief of Staff for United States Army Southern European Command and the Combined Joint Task Force 76, Operation Enduring Freedom.

Mayville's assignments as a general officer include Director of the Joint Staff, Director for Operations, J-3 for the Joint Staff; deputy director for Operations, J‐3 and deputy director for Plans and Policy, J‐5, for United States European Command; Deputy Commanding General for Support, 82d Airborne Division and Combined Joint Task Force 82, Operation Enduring Freedom, and the Director of Operations for HQ, International Security Assistance Force (ISAF). Mayville commanded the 1st Infantry Division, deploying to Operation Enduring Freedom and commanding coalition operations in Regional Command East.

Mayville was one of the leading candidates to replace Admiral Michael S. Rogers as the commander of U.S. Cyber Command. He was appointed as one of Cyber Command's deputy commanders, which was a temporary position created for him, in order to manage the tasks necessary to elevate Cyber Command into a unified combatant command, and to transition into Cyber Command's next four-star commander. Following this assignment, Mayville retired from the US Army on 31 May 2018 with 36 years of active duty service.

== Education ==
Mayville's military and civilian education includes the Command and General Staff College, the Naval War College, and the Georgia Institute of Technology.

== Awards and decorations ==
Combat Infantryman Badge with Star (denoting 2nd award)
Expert Infantryman Badge
Ranger Tab
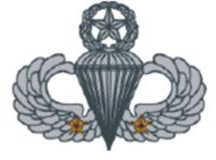
Master Parachutist Badge with 2 Combat Jump Devices
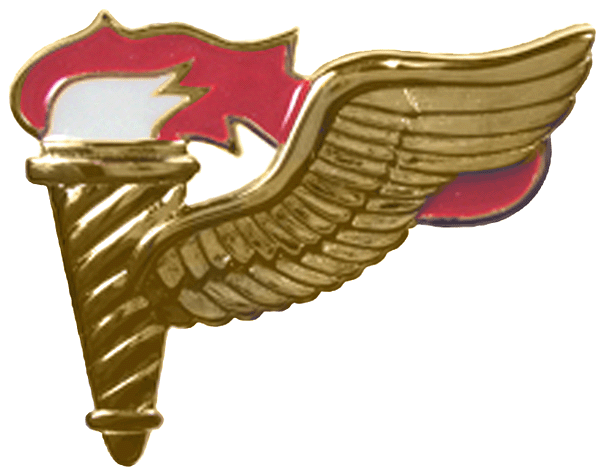
Pathfinder Badge
Joint Chiefs of Staff Identification Badge
1st Infantry Division Combat Service Identification Badge
75th Ranger Regiment Distinctive Unit Insignia
Canadian Jump Wings (non-operational)
9 Overseas Service Bars

Army Distinguished Service Medal
Defense Superior Service Medal with one bronze oak leaf cluster
Legion of Merit with oak leaf cluster
Bronze Star Medal with "V" device and two oak leaf clusters
Defense Meritorious Service Medal
Meritorious Service Medal with 3 oak leaf clusters
Army Commendation Medal with oak leaf cluster
Army Achievement Medal
Joint Meritorious Unit Award with oak leaf cluster
Valorous Unit Award
Meritorious Unit Commendation
National Defense Service Medal with one bronze service star
Armed Forces Expeditionary Medal with Arrowhead Device
Afghanistan Campaign Medal with three service stars
Global War on Terrorism Expeditionary Medal with Arrowhead Device
Global War on Terrorism Service Medal
Army Service Ribbon
Army Overseas Service Ribbon with bronze award numeral 7
NATO Medal for service with ISAF
Legion of Honour, Knight (France)

Military offices
Preceded by Kurt W. Tidd	Director of Operations of the Joint Staff; 2013–2015	Succeeded by Tod D. Wolters
