= Headquarters Air Force badge =

Headquarters Air Force badge

The Headquarters Air Force badge was created in 2005 by the United States Air Force. Airmen currently assigned to Headquarters Air Force at the Pentagon or who have been assigned to a qualifying Headquarters Air Force staff or Secretary of the Air Force staff position for at least 365 consecutive days are entitled to wear the badge. Wearing the badge is optional.

Air Force Chief of Staff General T. Michael Moseley approved the design and development of the badge in September 2005.

== Description ==
The basis for the Headquarters Air Force badge is Air Force heritage and the design incorporates many elements from the Department of the Air Force Seal.

The predominant colors of the badge are ultramarine blue and gold, the colors of the Air Force through transition from the Army Air Corps. At the center of the badge is a gilt American bald eagle, a symbol of the United States and air power. The eagle is holding an olive branch and a bundle of 13 arrows, denoting the power of peace and war—the heart of the Air Force mission. The Air Force shield is at the core of the eagle. On the background is a blue pentagon, representing The Pentagon.

A silver wreath, an ancient symbol of victory, encircles the badge and meets the old Army Air Corps roundel. The eagle holds a streamer with the Latin motto "E pluribus unum," which means "Out of many, one," and represents the original 13 colonies forming into one nation.

== Placement ==
According to AFI 36-2903 "Center duty or miscellaneous badge 1½ inches below top of welt pocket and centered, and/or on right side centered 1½ inch below the nametag" for men, and "centered on the wearer's right 1/2 inch above the name tag" for women.

== Equivalents ==
The United States Army has an equivalent badge, known as the Army Staff Identification Badge.
