= Aerial Achievement Medal =

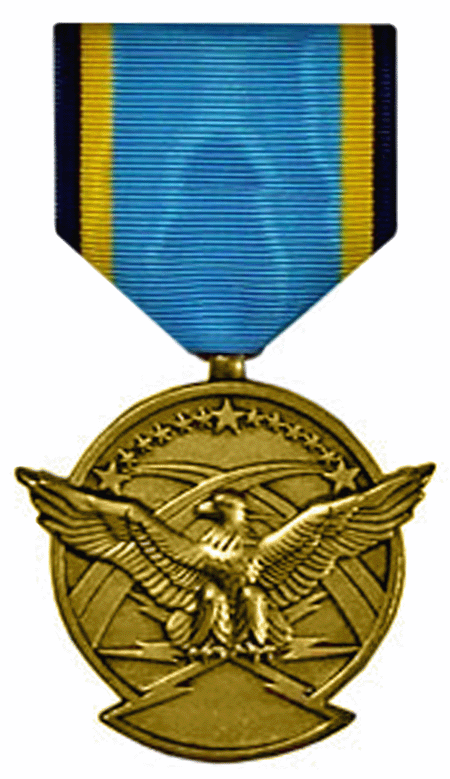
- Type: Military medal
- Awarded for: sustained meritorious achievement while participating in aerial flight
- Presented by: Department of the Air Force
- Eligibility: US military and civilian personnel
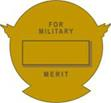
- Reverse
- Status: Currently awarded
- Established: Secretary of the Air Force - Feb. 3, 1988
- Service ribbon

Precedence
- Next (higher): Air Medal
- Next (lower): Joint Service Commendation Medal

The Aerial Achievement Medal (AAM) is a decoration of the United States Air Force and United States Space Force which was established in 1988. The decoration is intended to recognize the contributions of aircrew members who would, otherwise, not be qualified for the award of the Air Medal.

The decoration is awarded in the name of the Secretary of the Air Force and is presented to members of the United States military or civilian personnel, while serving in a capacity with the U.S. Air Force, who distinguish themselves by sustained meritorious achievement while participating in aerial flight. The achievements must be accomplished with distinction above and beyond that normally expected of professional airmen.

Pilots/sensors of Unmanned aerial vehicles may also receive this award. One was given in 1997 for successfully flying a disabled UAV back to its base. According to a report based on Air Force statistics, from January 2009 to mid-2010 3497 medals were granted to operators, while 1408 more were given to pilots.

The Aerial Achievement Medal may be approved by local commanders; however, the missions for which the decoration is authorized must be approved by a Major Air Force Command.

Minimum requirements for an Aerial Achievement Medal are 20 flights of at least 2 hours with one flight per theater per day. For the basic Aerial Achievement medal, 14 flights may be used. However, if this is the case, then 26 flights must be used for the first Oak Leaf Cluster.

Enlisted personnel receive three (3) promotion points per award.

The Aerial Achievement Medal service ribbon bears a resemblance to the Air Crew Europe Star ribbon.

== See also ==
- Combat Readiness Medal
- Awards and decorations of the United States military
