= List of United States Air Force lieutenant generals since 2020 =

Flag of an Air Force lieutenant general

The rank of lieutenant general (or three-star general) is the second-highest rank normally achievable in the United States Air Force, and the first to have a specified number of appointments set by statute. It ranks above major general (two-star general) and below general (four-star general).

There have been 78 lieutenant generals in the U.S. Air Force since 1 January 2020, eight of whom were elevated to four-star general. All 78 achieved that rank while on active duty in the U.S. Air Force. Lieutenant generals entered the Air Force via several paths: 30 were commissioned via the U.S. Air Force Academy (USAFA), 22 via Air Force Reserve Officer Training Corps (AFROTC) at a civilian university, eight via Air Force Officer Training School (OTS), three via direct commission (direct), three via AFROTC at a senior military college, and one via the U.S. Naval Academy (USNA).

== List of generals ==
Entries in the following list of lieutenant generals are indexed by the numerical order in which each officer was promoted to that rank while on active duty, or by an asterisk (*) if the officer did not serve in that rank while on active duty in the U.S. Air Force or was promoted to four-star rank while on active duty in the U.S. Air Force. Each entry lists the general's name, date of rank, (Note: Dates of rank are taken, where available, from the U.S. Air Force register of active and retired commissioned officers, or from the officer's official Air Force biography. The date listed is that of the officer's first promotion to lieutenant general. If such a date cannot be found, the next date substituted should be that of the officer's assumption of his/her first three-star appointment. Failing which, the officer's first Senate confirmation date to lieutenant general should be substituted.) active-duty positions held while serving at three-star rank, (Note: Positions listed are those held by the officer when promoted to lieutenant general. Dates listed are for the officer's full tenure, which may predate promotion to three-star rank or postdate retirement from active duty. Positions held in an acting capacity are italicized.) number of years of active-duty service at three-star rank (Yrs), (Note: The number of years of active-duty service at three-star rank is approximated by subtracting the year in the "Date of rank" column from the last year in the "Position" column. Time spent between active-duty three-star assignments is not counted.) year commissioned and source of commission, (Note: Sources of commission are listed in parentheses after the year of commission and include: the United States Air Force Academy (USAFA); the United States Military Academy (USMA); the United States Naval Academy (USNA); Reserve Officer Training Corps (ROTC) at a civilian university; Air Force Reserve Officer Training Corps (AFROTC) at a civilian university; ROTC or AFROTC at a senior military college such as Texas A&M University (Texas A&M), the Virginia Military Institute (VMI), or Virginia Polytechnic Institute and State University (VPI); Air Force Officer Training School (OTS); and direct commission (direct).) number of years in commission when promoted to three-star rank (YC), (Note: The number of years in commission before being promoted to three-star rank is approximated by subtracting the year in the "Commission" column from the year in the "Date of rank" column.) and other biographical notes (years of birth and death are shown in parentheses in the Notes column). (Note: Notes include years of birth and death; awards of the Medal of Honor, Congressional Gold Medal, Presidential Medal of Freedom, or honors of similar significance; major government appointments; university presidencies or equivalents; familial relationships with other significant military officers or significant government officials such as U.S. Presidents, cabinet secretaries, U.S. Senators, or state governors; and unusual career events such as premature relief or death in office. Officers who served as enlisted airmen for 7 years or more prior to commissioning are also noted.) Officers transferred to the U.S. Space Force in the grade of lieutenant general are included while having previously held that rank in the Air Force previously are included, while Air Force officers first promoted to lieutenant general in the U.S. Space Force are excluded.

List of U.S. Air Force lieutenant generals since 2020
#	Name	Photo	Date of rank	Position	Yrs	Commission	YC	Notes
1	David A. Krumm		20 Apr 2020	Commander, Alaskan NORAD Region/Commander, Alaskan Command/Commander, Eleventh Air Force (CDRANR/CDRALCOM), 2020–2022.	2	1989 (AFROTC)	31	(1967– )
2	Scott L. Pleus		12 Jun 2020	Deputy Commander, U.S. Forces Korea/Commander, Air Component Command, United Nations Command/Commander, Air Component Command, ROK/U.S. Combined Forces Command/Commander, Seventh Air Force (DCDRUSFK/AIRCDRUNC/AIRCDRCFC), 2020–2024.; Director of Staff, U.S. Air Force (AF/DS), 2024–2026.; Vice Chief of Staff, U.S. Air Force (VCSAF), 2025.	5	1989 (AFROTC)	31	
3	S. Clinton Hinote		15 Jun 2020	Deputy Chief of Staff, Strategy, Integration and Requirements, Air Staff (DCS A5), 2020–2022.; Deputy Chief of Staff, Air Force Futures, Air Staff (DCS A5/7), 2022–2023.	3	1992 (USAFA)	28	
4	Carl E. Schaefer		21 Jun 2020	Deputy Commander, Air Force Materiel Command (DCOMAFMC), 2020–2023.	3	1990 (USAFA)	30	
*	Gregory M. Guillot		16 Jul 2020	Commander, U.S. Air Forces Central Command/Combined Forces Air Component Commander, U.S. Central Command (COMUSAFCENT/CFACC), 2020.; Commander, Ninth Air Force (Air Forces Central)/Combined Forces Air Component Commander, U.S. Central Command (COMAFCENT/CFACC), 2020–2022.; Deputy Commander, U.S. Central Command (DCDRUSCENTCOM), 2022–2024.	4	1989 (USAFA)	31	(c. 1961– ) (Note: Served as Commander, North American Aerospace Defense Command (CDRNORAD).) Promoted to general, 5 Feb 2024.
5	Michael A. Loh		22 Jul 2020	Director, Air National Guard (DIRANG), 2020–2024.	4	1984 (USAFA)	36	(1962– ) Son of Air Force four-star general John M. Loh.
6	Kirk S. Pierce		29 Jul 2020	Commander, First Air Force (Air Forces Northern)/Commander, Continental U.S. NORAD Region/Combined Force Air Component Commander, North American Aerospace Defense Command/Joint Force Air Component Commander, U.S. Northern Command (COMAFNORTH/CDRCONR/CFACCNORAD/JFACC USNORTHCOM), 2020–2022.; Commander, First Air Force (Air Forces Northern/Air Forces Space)/Commander, Continental U.S. NORAD Region/Combined Force Air Component Commander, North American Aerospace Defense Command/Joint Force Air Component Commander, U.S. Northern Command (COMAFNORTH/COMAFSPACE/CDRCONR/CFACCNORAD/JFACC USNORTHCOM), 2022–2023.	3	1988 (AFROTC)	32	(1966– )
7	Tony D. Bauernfeind		31 Jul 2020	Vice Commander, U.S. Special Operations Command (VCDRUSSOCOM), 2020–2022.; Commander, Air Force Special Operations Command (COMAFSOC), 2022–2024.; Superintendent, U.S. Air Force Academy, 2024–2026.	5	1991 (USAFA)	29	
8	Kirk W. Smith		4 Aug 2020	Deputy Commander, U.S. Africa Command (DCDRUSAFRICOM), 2020–2024.	4	1989 (USAFA)	31	(1967– )
9	Brian S. Robinson		14 Aug 2020	Deputy Commander, Air Mobility Command (DCOMAMC), 2020–2022.; Commander, Air Education and Training Command (COMAETC), 2022–2025.	5	1987 (OTS)	33	(1965– )
10	Jeffrey A. Kruse		16 Aug 2020	Director's Advisor for Military Affairs, Office of the Director of National Intelligence (ADV-ODNI), 2020–2024.; Director, Defense Intelligence Agency (DIRDIA), 2024–present.	5	1990 (AFROTC)	30	(1968– )
11	Charles L. Moore Jr.		3 Sep 2020	Deputy Commander, U.S. Cyber Command (DCDRUSCYBERCOM), 2020–2022.	2	1989 (USAFA)	31	(1966– )
12	Shaun Q. Morris		3 Sep 2020	Commander, Air Force Life Cycle Management Center/Program Executive Officer, Rapid Sustainment Office (COMAFLCMC/PEORSO), 2020–2023.	3	1988 (USAFA)	32	
13	Sam C. Barrett		4 Sep 2020	Director, Logistics, Joint Staff, J4, 2020–2022.	2	1988 (USAFA)	32	
14	James C. Dawkins Jr.		1 Oct 2020	Deputy Chief of Staff, Strategic Deterrence and Nuclear Integration, Air Staff (DCS A10), 2020–2023.	3	1989 (OTS)	31	(1966– )
15	Andrew A. Croft		28 Dec 2020	Military Deputy Commander, U.S. Southern Command (MILDEPUSSOUTHCOM), 2021–2023.	3	1988 (AFROTC)	32	(1965– )
16	Robert J. Skinner		25 Feb 2021	Director, Defense Information Systems Agency/Commander, Joint Force Headquarters – Department of Defense Information Network (DIRDISA/CDRJFHQ-DoDIN), 2021–2024.	3	1989 (OTS)	32	
17	Robert I. Miller		4 Jun 2021	Surgeon General, U.S. Air Force and Space Force (AF & SF/SG), 2021–2024.	3	1989 (direct)	32	(1963– )
18	Russell L. Mack		16 Aug 2021	Deputy Commander, Air Combat Command (DCOMACC), 2021–2023.	2	1988 (OTS)	33	
19	Tom D. Miller		17 Aug 2021	Commander, Air Force Sustainment Center (COMAFSC), 2021–2022.; Deputy Chief of Staff for Logistics, Engineering and Force Protection, Air Staff (DCS A4), 2022–2025.	4	1990 (AFROTC)	31	
20	James A. Jacobson		20 Aug 2021	Deputy Commander, Pacific Air Forces/Deputy Theater Air Component Commander to the Commander, U.S. Indo-Pacific Command (DCOMPACAF/DEPAIRCDRINDOPACOM), 2021–2024.	3	1990 (USAFA)	31	
21	Mark E. Weatherington		23 Aug 2021	Deputy Commander, Air Force Global Strike Command/Deputy Commander, Air Forces Strategic-Air, U.S. Strategic Command (DCOMAFGSC/DCOMAFSTRATAIR), 2021–2023.	2	1990 (USAFA)	31	(1967– )
22	Ricky N. Rupp		27 Aug 2021	Commander, U.S. Forces Japan/Commander, Fifth Air Force (COMUSFJ), 2021–2024.	3	1989 (AFROTC)	32	
23	David J. Julazadeh		4 Oct 2021	Deputy Chief of Staff for Capability Development, Headquarters Supreme Allied Commander Transformation (DCOFS-CD), 2021–2024.	3	1990 (AFROTC)	31	(1966– )
24	Lance K. Landrum		11 Oct 2021	Deputy Chair, NATO Military Committee (DCMC), 2021–2023.	2	1992 (USAFA)	29	(c. 1970– )
*	J. Daniel Caine		3 Nov 2021	Associate Director, Military Affairs, Central Intelligence Agency (ADMA), 2021–2024.	3	1990 (VMI)	31	(1968– ) (Note: Retired as lieutenant general, December 2024; recalled as general, April 2025.) (Note: Served as Chairman, Joint Chiefs of Staff (CJCS).) Promoted to general, 11 Apr 2025.
25	Stephen L. Davis		2 Mar 2022	Inspector General, U.S. Department of the Air Force (DAF/IG), 2022–2025.	3	1989 (OTS)	33	
26	Caroline M. Miller		26 May 2022	Deputy Chief of Staff, Manpower, Personnel and Services, Air Staff (DCS A1), 2022–2026.	3	1994 (OTS)	28	(1968– ) (Note: Promoted directly from rank of brigadier general.)
27	Charles L. Plummer		26 May 2022	Judge Advocate General, U.S. Air Force and Space Force (AF & SF/JA), 2022–2025.	3	1995 (direct) (Note: Directly commissioned via the JAG Corps Direct Appointment Program.)	27	Relieved, 2025.
*	Randall Reed		3 Jun 2022	Deputy Commander, Air Mobility Command (DCOMAMC), 2022–2024.	2	1989 (USAFA)	33	(c. 1967– ) (Note: Served as a combatant commander (CCDR).) Promoted to general, 4 Oct 2024.
28	Richard G. Moore Jr.		30 Jun 2022	Deputy Chief of Staff, Plans and Programs, Air Staff (DCS A8), 2022–2024.	2	1992 (USAFA)	30	
29	Michael J. Schmidt		5 Jul 2022	Program Executive Officer, F-35 Lightning II Joint Program Office (PEO F-35), 2022–2025.	3	1991 (AFROTC)	31	
*	John D. Lamontagne		7 Jul 2022	Deputy Commander, U.S. Air Forces in Europe – Air Forces Africa (DCOMUSAFE-AFAFRICA), 2022–2024.	2	1992 (USAFA)	30	(c. 1970– ) Promoted to general, 7 Sep 2024.
*	Alexus G. Grynkewich		21 Jul 2022	Commander, Ninth Air Force (Air Forces Central)/Combined Forces Air Component Commander, U.S. Central Command (COMAFCENT/CFACC), 2022–2024.; Director, Operations, Joint Staff, J3, 2024–2025.	3	1993 (USAFA)	29	(1971– ) (Note: Served as Supreme Allied Commander Europe (SACEUR).) Promoted to general, 1 Jul 2025.
30	Kevin B. Kennedy		21 Jul 2022	Commander, Sixteenth Air Force (Air Forces Cyber)/Commander, Joint Force Headquarters – Cyber (Air Force) (COMAFCYBER/CDRJFHQ-C), 2022–2024.	2	1990 (USAFA)	32	
31	Andrea D. Tullos		25 Jul 2022	Commander/President, Air University (COM/Pres. AU), 2022–2025.	3	1991 (OTS)	31	
32	Leonard J. Kosinski		2 Aug 2022	Director, Logistics, Joint Staff, J4, 2022–2024.	2	1993 (USAFA)	29	
33	John P. Healy		3 Aug 2022	Chief, Air Force Reserve/Commander, Air Force Reserve Command (CAFR/COMAFRC), 2022–2026.	3	1989 (AFROTC)	33	(c. 1967– )
34	Leah G. Lauderback		6 Aug 2022	Deputy Chief of Staff, Intelligence, Surveillance, Reconnaissance, and Cyber Effects Operations, Air Staff (DCS A2/6), 2022–2025.	3	1993 (AFROTC)	29	
*	Dagvin R. M. Anderson		8 Aug 2022	Director, Joint Force Development, Joint Staff, J7, 2022–2025.	3	1992 (AFROTC)	30	(1970– ) Promoted to general, 15 Aug 2025.
35	Stacey T. Hawkins		15 Aug 2022	Commander, Air Force Sustainment Center (COMAFSC), 2022–2025.	3	1991 (USAFA)	31	
36	Donna D. Shipton		22 Aug 2022	Military Deputy to the Assistant Secretary of the Air Force for Acquisition, Technology and Logistics (MILDEP SAF/AQ), 2022–2023.; Commander, Air Force Life Cycle Management Center (COMAFLCMC), 2024–2026.	3	1991 (AFROTC)	31	(c. 1970– )
*	Steven S. Nordhaus		31 Mar 2023	Commander, First Air Force (Air Forces Northern/Air Forces Space)/Commander, Continental U.S. NORAD Region/Combined Force Air Component Commander, North American Aerospace Defense Command/Joint Force Air Component Commander, U.S. Northern Command (COMAFNORTH/COMAFSPACE/CDRCONR/CFACCNORAD/JFACC USNORTHCOM), 2023–2024.	1	1989 (USAFA)	34	(1966– ) (Note: Served as Chief, National Guard Bureau (CNGB).) Promoted to general, 2 Oct 2024.
37	David A. Harris Jr.		5 Dec 2023	Deputy Chief of Staff, Air Force Futures, Air Staff (DCS A5/7), 2023–2026.	2			
38	Heath A. Collins		5 Dec 2023	Director, Missile Defense Agency (DIRMDA), 2023–present.	2	1993 (AFROTC)	35	(c. 1971– )
39	Andrew J. Gebara		5 Dec 2023	Deputy Chief of Staff, Strategic Deterrence and Nuclear Integration, Air Staff (DCS A10), 2023–2026.; Director of Staff, U.S. Air Force (AF/DS), 2026-present.	2	1991 (USNA)	32	(c. 1969– )
*	Adrian L. Spain		19 Dec 2023	Deputy Chief of Staff, Operations, Air Staff (DCS A3), 2023–2025.	2	1994 (AFROTC)	29	Promoted to general, 11 Aug 2025.
40	Dale R. White		27 Dec 2023	Military Deputy to the Assistant Secretary of the Air Force for Acquisition, Technology and Logistics (MILDEP SAF/AQ), 2023–2025.	2	1997 (AFROTC)	26	(c. 1971– )
41	Michael G. Koscheski		5 Jan 2024	Deputy Commander, Air Combat Command (DCOMACC), 2024–2026.	1	1992 (USAFA)	32	
42	Michael J. Lutton		8 Jan 2024	Deputy Commander, Air Force Global Strike Command/Deputy Commander, Air Forces Strategic-Air, U.S. Strategic Command (DCOMAFGSC/DCOMAFSTRATAIR), 2024–2025.; Deputy Commander, U.S. Strategic Command (DCDRUSSTRATCOM), 2025-present.	1	1990 (AFROTC)	34	
43	Linda S. Hurry		13 Jan 2024	Deputy Commander, Air Force Materiel Command (DCOMAFMC), 2024–present.; Commander, Air Force Materiel Command (COMAFMC), 2025–present.	1	1991 (USAFA)	33	
44	David R. Iverson		30 Jan 2024	Deputy Commander, U.S. Forces Korea/Commander, Air Component Command, United Nations Command/Commander, Air Component Command, ROK/U.S. Combined Forces Command/Commander, Seventh Air Force (DCDRUSFK/AIRCDRUNC/AIRCDRCFC), 2024–2026.; Deputy Commander, Pacific Air Forces/Deputy Theater Air Component Commander to the Commander, U.S. Pacific Command (DCOMPACAF/DEPAIRCDRINDOPACOM), 2026–present.	1	1991 (AFROTC)	33	(c. 1969– )
45	Laura L. Lenderman		23 Feb 2024	Deputy Commander, Pacific Air Forces/Deputy Theater Air Component Commander to the Commander, U.S. Indo-Pacific Command (DCOMPACAF/DEPAIRCDRINDOPACOM), 2024–2026.	1	1993 (AFROTC)	31	
46	Sean M. Farrell		8 Mar 2024	Deputy Commander, U.S. Special Operations Command (DCDRUSSOCOM), 2024–present.	1	1990 (AFROTC)	34	
47	Derek C. France		18 Apr 2024	Commander, Ninth Air Force (Air Forces Central)/Combined Forces Air Component Commander, U.S. Central Command (COMAFCENT/CFACC), 2024–2026.	1	1992 (USAFA)	32	(c. 1970– )
48	David H. Tabor		1 Jul 2024	Deputy Chief of Staff, Plans and Programs, Air Staff (DCS A8), 2024–present.	1	1992 (AFROTC)	32	
49	Michael E. Conley		1 Jul 2024	Commander, Air Force Special Operations Command (COMAFSOC), 2024–present.	1	1996 (USAFA)	28	
50	John J. DeGoes		31 Jul 2024	Surgeon General, U.S. Air Force and Space Force (AF & SF/SG), 2024–2025.; Surgeon General, U.S. Air Force and Space Force/Commander, Air Force Medical Command (AF & SF/SG/COMAFMEDCOM), 2025–present.	1	1989 (direct)	35	
51	Thomas K. Hensley		1 Aug 2024	Commander, Sixteenth Air Force (Air Forces Cyber)/Commander, Joint Force Headquarters – Cyber (Air Force) (COMAFCYBER/CDRJFHQ-C), 2024–present.	1	1992 (Texas A&M)	32	
52	Case A. Cunningham		9 Aug 2024	Commander, Alaskan NORAD Region/Commander, Alaskan Command/Commander, Eleventh Air Force (CDRANR/CDRALCOM), 2024–2025.; Deputy Chief of Staff, Operations, Air Staff (DCS A3), 2025-present.	1	1994 (USAFA)	30	(c. 1972– )
53	Jason T. Hinds		30 Aug 2024	Deputy Commander, U.S. Air Forces in Europe – Air Forces Africa (DCOMUSAFE-AFAFRICA), 2024–present.; Commander, U.S. Air Forces in Europe – Air Forces Africa (COMUSAFE/COMAFAFRICA), 2025–present.	1	1996 (AFROTC)	28	(c. 1974– )
54	Jennifer M. Short		30 Sep 2024	Senior Military Assistant to the Secretary of Defense (SMA SecDef), 2024–2025.	1	1995 (OTS)	29	(c. 1970– ) Relieved, 2025. Daughter of Air Force lieutenant general Michael C. Short.
55	M. Luke Ahmann		2 Oct 2024	Commander, First Air Force (Air Forces Northern/Air Forces Space)/Commander, Continental U.S. NORAD Region/Combined Force Air Component Commander, North American Aerospace Defense Command/Joint Force Air Component Commander, U.S. Northern Command (COMAFNORTH/COMAFSPACE/CDRCONR/CFACCNORAD/JFACC USNORTHCOM), 2024–present.	1	1993 (USAFA)	31	(c. 1971– ) Son of Air Force lieutenant general James H. Ahmann.
56	Rebecca J. Sonkiss		7 Oct 2024	Deputy Commander, Air Mobility Command (DCOMAMC), 2024–present.	1	1994 (USAFA)	30	(c. 1972– )
57	Stephen F. Jost		8 Oct 2024	Commander, U.S. Forces Japan/Commander, Fifth Air Force (COMUSFJ), 2024–present.	1	1994 (USAFA)	30	(c. 1972– )
58	Evan L. Pettus		4 Nov 2024	Military Deputy Commander, U.S. Southern Command (MILDEPUSSOUTHCOM), 2024–present.	1	1994 (USAFA)	30	(c. 1972– )
59	Michael L. Downs		2 Dec 2024	Associate Director, Military Affairs, Central Intelligence Agency (ADMA), 2024–present.	1	1992 (Texas A&M)	32	
60	Max E. Pearson		12 Aug 2025	Deputy Chief of Staff, Intelligence, Air Staff (DCS A2), 2025–present.	0	1998 (USAFA)	27	
61	Kenyon K. Bell		19 Sep 2025	Deputy Chief of Staff for Logistics, Engineering and Force Protection, Air Staff (DCS A4), 2025–present.	0	1995 (USAFA)	30	
62	Robert D. Davis		15 Oct 2025	Commander, Alaskan NORAD Region/Commander, Alaskan Command/Commander, Eleventh Air Force (CDRANR/CDRALCOM), 2025–present.	0	1996 (USAFA)	29	
63	Clark Quinn		30 Oct 2025	Commander, Air Education and Training Command (COMAETC), 2025-present.	0	1991 (AFROTC)	34	
64	Jason R. Armagost		6 Nov 2025	Deputy Commander, Air Force Global Strike Command/Deputy Commander, Air Forces Strategic-Air, U.S. Strategic Command (DCOMAFGSC/DCOMAFSTRATAIR), 2025-present.	0	1992 (USAFA)	33	
65	Daniel H. Tulley		7 Nov 2025	Commander/President, Air University (COM/Pres. AU), 2025-2026.; Commander, Air Mobility Command (COMAMC), 2026–present.	0	1993 (AFROTC)	32	
66	David B. Lyons		10 Nov 2025	Inspector General, U.S. Department of the Air Force (DAF/IG), 2025-present.	0	1992 (AFROTC)	34	
67	Jennifer Hammerstedt		17 Nov 2025	Commander, Air Force Sustainment Center (COMAFSC), 2025-present.	0	1996 (AFROTC)	30	
68	Luke C.G. Cropsey		2 Feb 2026	Military Deputy to the Assistant Secretary of the Air Force for Acquisition, Technology and Logistics (MILDEP SAF/AQ), 2026–present.	0	1995 (USAFA)	31	
69	Joel L. Carey		24 Mar 2026	Commander, Fifth Air Force (5AF), 2026–present.	0	1992 (AFROTC)	34	
70	Christopher J. Niemi		12 May 2026	Deputy Chief of Staff for Force Modernization, Air Staff (DCS A5/7), 2026–present.	0	1993 (AFROTC)	33	
71	Jefferson J. O'Donnell		2 Jun 2026	Deputy Chief of Staff, Manpower, Personnel and Services, Air Staff (DCS A1), 2026–present.	0	1995 (AFROTC)	31	
72	Brandon D. Parker		3 Jun 2026	Deputy Chief of Staff, Strategic Deterrence and Nuclear Integration, Air Staff (DCS A10), 2026–present.	0	1996 (USAFA)	30	
73	Paul R. Fast		3 Aug 2026	Chief, Air Force Reserve/Commander, Air Force Reserve Command (CAFR/COMAFRC), 2026–present.	0	1991 (AFROTC)	35	
74	Jason D. Voorheis		3 Aug 2026	Commander, Air Force Life Cycle Management Center (COMAFLCMC), 2026–present.	0	1991 (AFROTC)	35	
75	Larry D. Broadwell Jr.		3 Aug 2026	Deputy Commander, Air Combat Command (DCOMACC), 2026–present.	0	1991 (AFROTC)	35	
76	Daniel T. Lasica		4 Aug 2026	Commander, Ninth Air Force (Air Forces Central)/Combined Forces Air Component Commander, U.S. Central Command (COMAFCENT/CFACC), 2026–present.	0	1994 (USAFA)	32	
77	David G. Shoemaker		7 Aug 2026	Deputy Commander, U.S. Forces Korea/Commander, Air Component Command, United Nations Command/Commander, Air Component Command, ROK/U.S. Combined Forces Command/Commander, Seventh Air Force (DCDRUSFK/AIRCDRUNC/AIRCDRCFC), 2026–present.	0	1995 (USAFA)	31	
78	Paul D. Moga		7 Aug 2026	Superintendent, U.S. Air Force Academy, 2026–present.	0	1995 (USAFA)	31	

== Background ==
=== Modern use of the rank ===
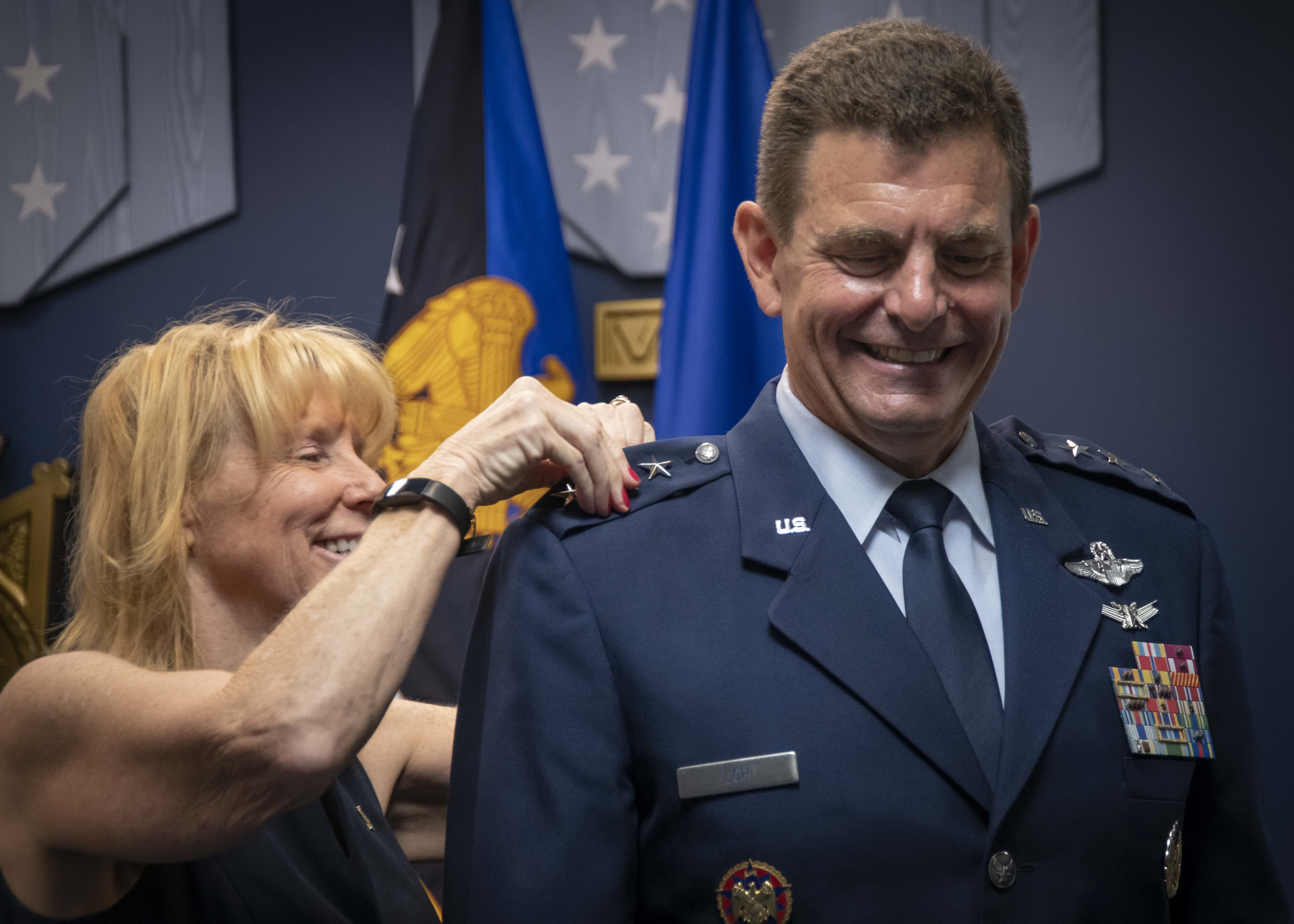
Lt Gen Michael A. Loh is pinned with his new rank by his wife Dianne on 28 July 2020.

Lieutenant generals in the United States Air Force typically serve in high-level command and staff positions, including as commanders of major commands (MAJCOMs), commanders of numbered air forces (NAF) that are concurrently designated as service component commands under a four-star unified combatant commander and deputy commanders of four-star major commands. Under the Air Staff, this includes the director of staff and deputy chiefs of staff (limited to 8 by statute), as well as the inspector general. High-level specialty positions such as the surgeon general and chief of Air Force Reserve may also hold three-star rank, though not by statute. The superintendent of the United States Air Force Academy and director of the Air National Guard have been three-star positions since 1983 (Note: While several lieutenant generals have served as superintendent since the academy's founding, there have been no Senate-confirmed officeholders below that rank since Robert E. Kelley, who was superintendent from 1981 to 1983.) and 2002 respectively.

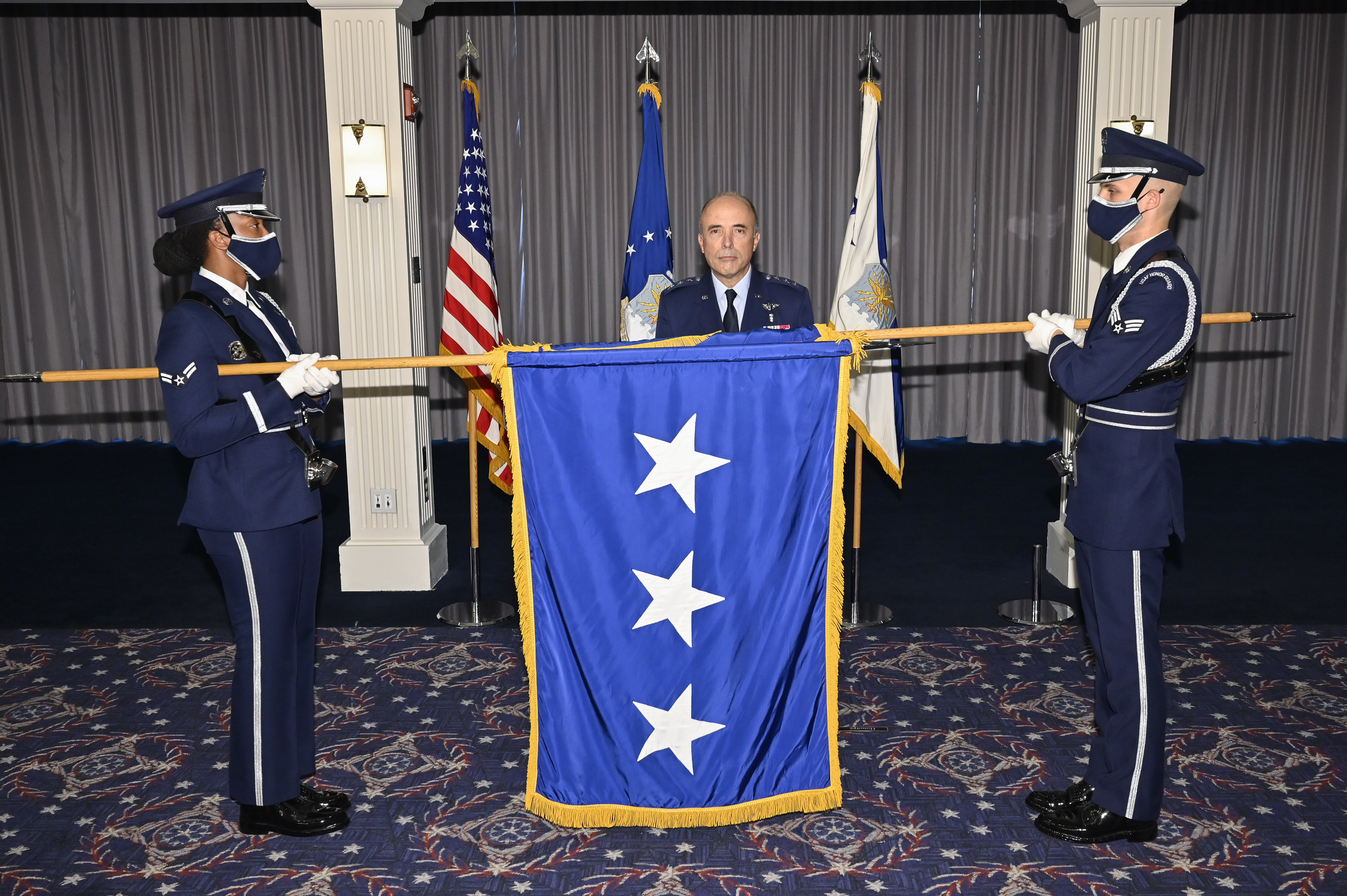
Lt. Gen. Robert I. Miller has his new three-star flag unfurled during his promotion ceremony on 4 June 2021.

About 30 to 50 joint service three-star billets exist at any given time that can be occupied by an Air Force lieutenant general, among the most prestigious being the director of the Joint Staff (DJS), principal staff advisor to the chairman of the Joint Chiefs of Staff and historically considered a stepping stone to four-star rank. All deputy commanders of the unified combatant commands are of three-star rank, (Note: The deputy commander of U.S. European Command was a four-star position until 2007, when it was reduced in rank to make way for the establishment of U.S. Africa Command, commanded by a four-star officer. The last four-star deputy commander of USEUCOM, General William E. Ward, also became the first commander of USAFRICOM.) as are directors of Defense Agencies not headed by a civilian such as the director of the Defense Intelligence Agency (DIRDIA). Internationally based three-star positions include the deputy chair of the NATO Military Committee (DCMC), United States military representative to the NATO Military Committee (USMILREP), and the security coordinator for Israel and the Palestinian National Authority. All nominees for three-star rank must be confirmed via majority by the Senate before the appointee can take office and thus assume the rank.

==== Statutory limits, elevations and reductions ====
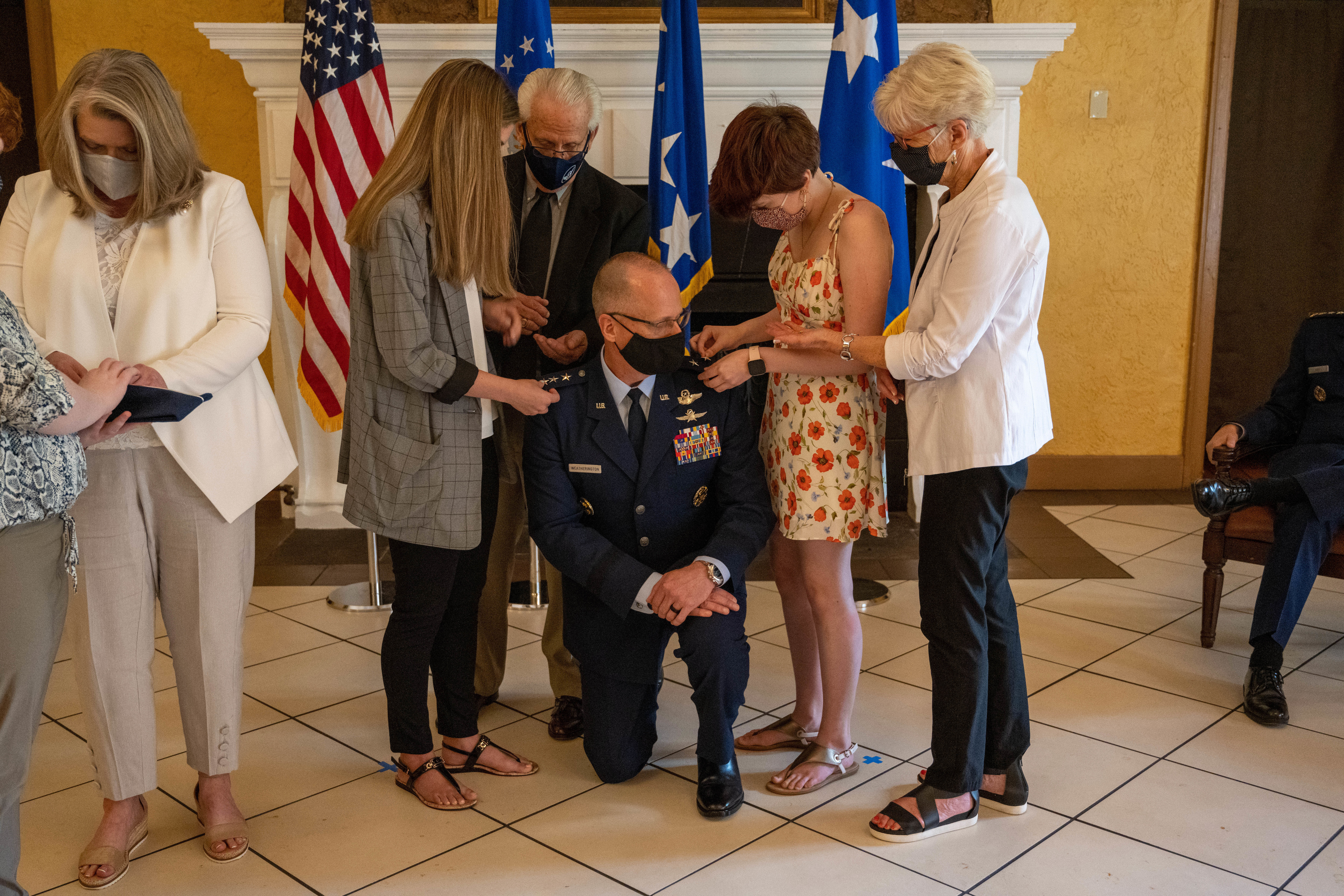
Maj Gen Mark E. Weatherington is pinned with the rank of lieutenant general on 14 August 2021.

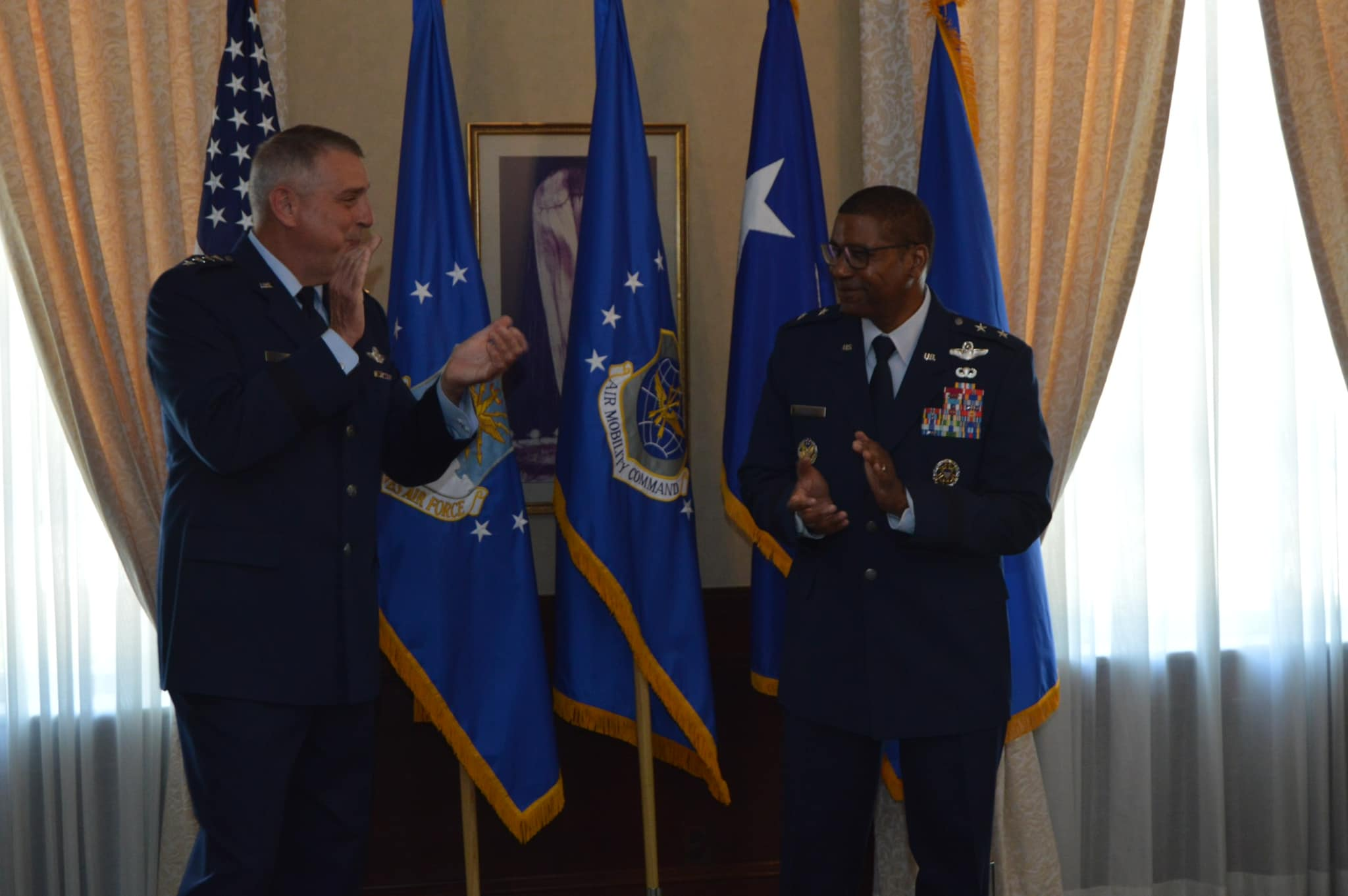
Newly promoted Lt Gen Randall Reed is congratulated by Gen Michael A. Minihan on 3 June 2022.

The U.S. Code states that no more than 44 officers in the U.S. Air Force may hold the rank of lieutenant general on the active duty list, aside from those on joint duty assignments. Three-star positions can be elevated to four-star status or reduced to two-star status where deemed necessary, either to highlight their increasing importance (Note: 10 U.S.C. § 601 refers to positions held by four-star and three-star officers as "positions of importance and responsibility".) to the defense apparatus (or lack thereof) or to achieve parity with equivalent commands in other services or regions.

- Lieutenant General Jeffrey A. Kruse was appointed the first advisor for military to the director of national intelligence on 17 August 2021 amid organizational changes to the ODNI. The role was created to serve as a "focal point" for the ODNI to communicate with the Department of Defense, including the under secretary of defense for intelligence and security, combat support agency directors and the combatant commands.

==== Senate confirmations ====
Military nominations are considered by the Senate Armed Services Committee. While it is rare for three-star or four-star nominations to face even token opposition in the Senate, nominations that do face opposition due to controversy surrounding the nominee in question are typically withdrawn. Nominations that are not withdrawn are allowed to expire without action at the end of the legislative session.

- For example, the nomination of Major General Ryan F. Gonsalves for promotion to lieutenant general and assignment as commanding general of U.S. Army Europe was withdrawn in November 2017 after an investigation was launched into the general's inappropriate comment to a female Congressional staffer. As a result, Gonsalves was administratively reprimanded and retired in May 2018.

Additionally, events that take place after Senate confirmation may still delay or even prevent the nominee from assuming office.

- For example, Major General John G. Rossi, who had been confirmed for promotion to lieutenant general and assignment as the commanding general of the U.S. Army Space and Missile Defense Command in April 2016 committed suicide two days before his scheduled promotion and assumption of command. As a result, the then incumbent commander of USASMDC, Lieutenant General David L. Mann, remained in command beyond customary term limits until another nominee, Major General James H. Dickinson was confirmed by the Senate.

The 2020 National Defense Authorization Act explicitly prohibits adding new general officer billets to the Space Force beyond the sole four-star billet of the chief of space operations. This necessitated that five Air Force three-star appointments be transferred to the Space Force, leaving them with 30 as opposed to 35 available three-star positions.

- For example, the position of commander of the Space and Missile Systems Center (SMC) was transferred to the Space Force as the center transitioned into the Space Systems Command (SSC), the second Space Force field command to be established. The last Air Force general to command SMC, Lieutenant General John F. Thompson retired in August 2021 to make way for Lieutenant General Michael A. Guetlein, who assumed command of Space Systems Command on 13 August 2021.

== See also ==
- Lieutenant general (United States)
- General officers in the United States
- List of active duty United States four-star officers
- List of active duty United States three-star officers
- List of United States Air Force four-star generals
- List of lieutenant generals in the United States Air Force before 1960
- List of United States Air Force lieutenant generals from 2000 to 2009
- List of United States Air Force lieutenant generals from 2010 to 2019
- List of United States Space Force lieutenant generals
- List of United States military leaders by rank
