= Mark Slocum =

U.S. Air Force general

Mark H. Slocum
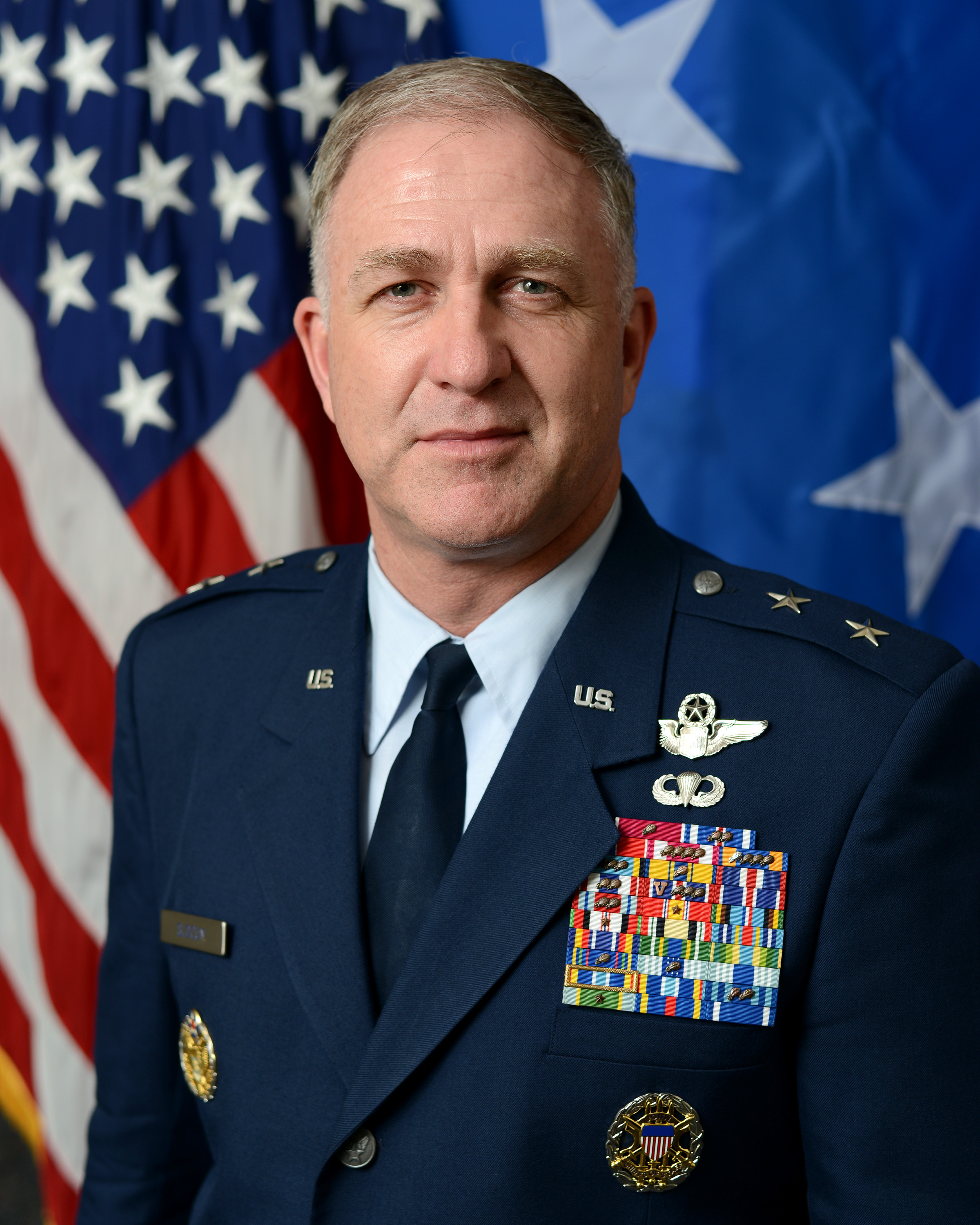
- Born: Los Altos, California, U.S.
- Military career
- Allegiance: United States
- Branch: United States Air Force
- Service years: 1992–present
- Rank: Major General
- Commands: 332nd Air Expeditionary Wing; 4th Fighter Wing; 48th Operations Group; 391st Fighter Squadron
- Awards: Legion of Merit (3)

Mark Holmes Slocum is a United States Air Force major general who has served as the vice director for strategy, plans, and policy of the Joint Staff since May 2024. He most recently served as the assistant deputy chief of staff for operations of the United States Air Force from 2023 to 2024. He most recently served as the deputy commander of Ninth Air Force from March to June 2023. He previously served as the director of global operations of the U.S. Air Force from 2022 to 2023.

== Military career ==
In May 2022, Slocum's reassignment as director of global operations of the U.S. Air Force was announced.

Military offices
Preceded by Richard A. Coe	Inspector General of the Air Combat Command; 2018–2019	Succeeded by Paul J. Murray
Preceded by David R. Iverson	Commander of the 332nd Air Expeditionary Wing; 2019–2020	Succeeded by Joseph Kunkel
Preceded by Kevin Huyck	Director of Air and Space Operations of the Air Combat Command; 2020–2022	Succeeded by David B. Lyons
New office	Director of Global Operations of the United States Air Force; 2022–2023	Succeeded by ???
Preceded by David A. Harris Jr.	Deputy Commander of the Ninth Air Force; 2023	Succeeded by David A. Mineau
Preceded by James C. Slife	Deputy Chief of Staff for Operations of the United States Air Force; Acting; 2023–2024	Succeeded by Adrian L. Spain
Preceded by David J. Meyer	Assistant Deputy Chief of Staff for Operations of the United States Air Force; 2023–2024	Succeeded by John M. Klein Jr.
Preceded by Joseph McGee	Vice Director for Strategy, Plans, and Policy of the Joint Staff; 2024–present	Incumbent
