= David J. Meyer =

U.S. Air Force general

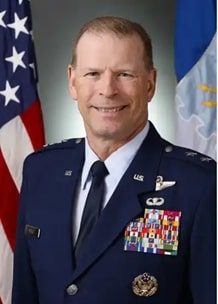
- Official portrait, 2022
- Military career
- Allegiance: United States
- Branch: United States Air Force
- Service years: 1987–2024
- Rank: Major General
- Commands: 169th Fighter Wing; 169th Operations Group
- Conflicts: Gulf War; War in Afghanistan; Iraq War
- Awards: Air Force Distinguished Service Medal; Defense Superior Service Medal (3); Legion of Merit (2)

David J. Meyer is a retired United States Air Force major general who served as the assistant deputy chief of staff for operations of the United States Air Force from July 2022 to June 2023. He most recently served as the deputy commander of the Ninth Air Force, and was previously the deputy director of operations of the North American Aerospace Defense Command.

Military offices
| Preceded by ??? | Deputy Director for Plans and Operations of the United States European Command; 2017–2019 | Succeeded by Christopher Sweeney |
| Preceded by Michael Koscheski | Deputy Commander of the Ninth Air Force; 2021–2022 | Succeeded by David A. Harris Jr. |
| Preceded by Charles Corcoran | Assistant Deputy Chief of Staff for Operations of the United States Air Force; 2022–2023 | Succeeded by Mark H. Slocum |
