= Leadership of the United States European Command =

Emblem of the United States European Command

This is a list of all commanders, deputy commanders, senior enlisted leaders, and chiefs of staff of the United States European Command.

== Current headquarters staff ==
- Alexus G. Grynkewich, Commander
  - Curtis D. Taylor, Deputy Commander
  - Thomas J. Holland, Senior Enlisted Leader
    - Russell Driggers, Chief of Staff
      - Gregory L. Holden, Director, Intelligence (J2)
      - Daniel T. Lasica, Director, Operations (J3)
      - James G. Kent, Director, Logistics (J4)
      - Vacant, Director, Plans, Policy, Strategy, and Capabilities (J5)
        - David Loo, Deputy Director, Plans, Policy, Strategy, and Capabilities. As of 1 July 2025
      - John H. Phillips, Director, Cyber (J6)
      - James R. Kriesel, Director, Exercises and Assessments (ECJ7)
      - Loyd W. Brown, Commandant, Headquarters, (HC)

== List of leaders of the United States European Command ==
=== Commanders ===
Commander of the United States European Command
- Emblem of the United States European Command

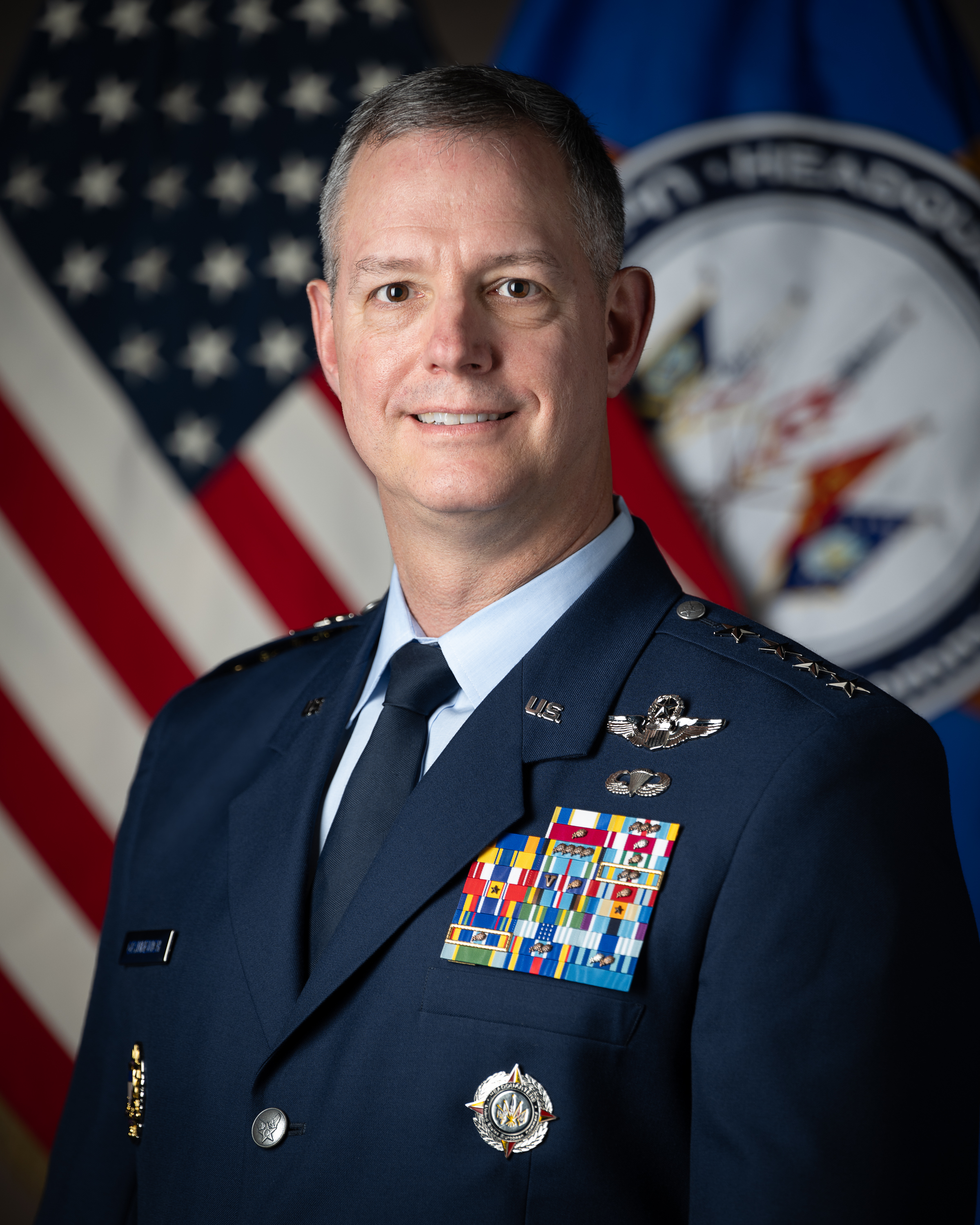
- Incumbent; General Alexus G. Grynkewich, USAF since 1 July 2025
- Abbreviation: CDRUSEUCOM
- Reports to: President of the United States; Secretary of Defense
- Seat: Patch Barracks, Stuttgart, Germany
- Appointer: The president; with Senate advice and consent
- Term length: 3 years
- Constituting instrument: 10 U.S.C. § 164
- Inaugural holder: Matthew Ridgway
- Formation: 30 May 1952
- Deputy: Deputy Commander, U.S. European Command

No.	Commander		Term			Service branch
No.	Portrait	Name	Took office	Left office	Duration	Service branch
As Commander-in-Chief (CINC), United States European Command
1	Matthew Ridgway	General; Matthew Ridgway (1895–1993)	30 May 1952	11 July 1953	1 year, 42 days	U.S. Army
2	Alfred Gruenther	General; Alfred Gruenther (1899–1983)	11 July 1953	20 November 1956	3 years, 132 days	U.S. Army
3	Lauris Norstad	General; Lauris Norstad (1907–1988)	20 November 1956	1 November 1962	5 years, 346 days	U.S. Air Force
4	Lyman Lemnitzer	General; Lyman Lemnitzer (1899–1988)	1 November 1962	1 July 1969	6 years, 242 days	U.S. Army
5	Andrew Goodpaster	General; Andrew Goodpaster (1915–2005)	1 July 1969	15 December 1974	5 years, 167 days	U.S. Army
6	Alexander M. Haig Jr.	General; Alexander M. Haig Jr. (1924–2010)	15 December 1974	1 July 1979	4 years, 198 days	U.S. Army
7	Bernard W. Rogers	General; Bernard W. Rogers (1921–2008)	1 July 1979	26 June 1987	7 years, 360 days	U.S. Army
8	John Galvin	General; John Galvin (1929–2015)	26 June 1987	23 June 1992	4 years, 363 days	U.S. Army
9	John Shalikashvili	General; John Shalikashvili (1936–2011)	23 June 1992	22 October 1993	1 year, 121 days	U.S. Army
10	George Joulwan	General; George Joulwan (born 1939)	22 October 1993	11 July 1997	3 years, 262 days	U.S. Army
11	Wesley Clark	General; Wesley Clark (born 1944)	11 July 1997	3 May 2000	2 years, 297 days	U.S. Army
12	Joseph Ralston	General; Joseph Ralston (born 1943)	3 May 2000	17 January 2003	2 years, 259 days	U.S. Air Force
13	James L. Jones	General; James L. Jones (born 1943)	17 January 2003	7 December 2006	3 years, 324 days	U.S. Marine Corps
As Commander, United States European Command
14	Bantz J. Craddock	General; Bantz J. Craddock (born 1949)	7 December 2006	2 July 2009	2 years, 207 days	U.S. Army
15	James G. Stavridis	Admiral; James G. Stavridis (born 1955)	2 July 2009	13 May 2013	3 years, 315 days	U.S. Navy
16	Philip M. Breedlove	General; Philip M. Breedlove (born 1955)	13 May 2013	4 May 2016	2 years, 357 days	U.S. Air Force
17	Curtis M. Scaparrotti	General; Curtis M. Scaparrotti (born 1956)	4 May 2016	3 May 2019	2 years, 364 days	U.S. Army
18	Tod D. Wolters	General; Tod D. Wolters (born 1960)	3 May 2019	1 July 2022	3 years, 59 days	U.S. Air Force
19	Christopher G. Cavoli	General; Christopher G. Cavoli (born c. 1964)	1 July 2022	1 July 2025	3 years, 0 days	U.S. Army
20	Alexus G. Grynkewich	General; Alexus G. Grynkewich (born 1971)	1 July 2025	Incumbent	1 year, 142 days	U.S. Air Force

Commanders of U.S. European Command by branches of service

- Army: 13
- Air Force: 5
- Navy: 1
- Marine Corps: 1
- Space Force: none
- Coast Guard: none

=== Deputy commanders ===
No.	Deputy Commander		Term			Service branch
No.	Portrait	Name	Took office	Left office	Duration	Service branch
As Deputy Commander-in-Chief (DCINC), United States European Command
1	Thomas T. Handy	General; Thomas T. Handy (1892–1982)	1 August 1952	1 April 1954	1 year, 243 days	U.S. Army
2	Orval R. Cook	General; Orval R. Cook (1898–1980)	1 April 1954	1 June 1956	2 years, 61 days	U.S. Air Force
3	George H. Decker	General; George H. Decker (1902–1980)	1 June 1956	1 June 1957	1 year, 0 days	U.S. Army
4	Williston B. Palmer	General; Williston B. Palmer (1899–1973)	1 June 1957	1 October 1959	2 years, 122 days	U.S. Army
5	Charles D. Palmer	General; Charles D. Palmer (1902–1999)	1 October 1959	1 March 1962	2 years, 151 days	U.S. Army
6	Earle Wheeler	General; Earle Wheeler (1908–1975)	1 March 1962	2 October 1962	215 days	U.S. Army
7	John P. McConnell	General; John P. McConnell (1908–1986)	2 October 1962	1 August 1964	1 year, 304 days	U.S. Air Force
8	Jacob E. Smart	General; Jacob E. Smart (1909–2006)	1 August 1964	28 July 1966	1 year, 361 days	U.S. Air Force
9	David A. Burchinal	General; David A. Burchinal (1915–1990)	28 July 1966	19 April 1973	6 years, 265 days	U.S. Air Force
10	George J. Eade	General; George J. Eade (1921–2018)	19 April 1973	1 September 1975	2 years, 135 days	U.S. Air Force
11	Robert E. Huyser	General; Robert E. Huyser (1924–1997)	1 September 1975	17 June 1979	3 years, 289 days	U.S. Air Force
12	James R. Allen	General; James R. Allen (1925–1992)	17 June 1979	25 June 1981	2 years, 8 days	U.S. Air Force
13	William Y. Smith	General; William Y. Smith (1925–2016)	25 June 1981	28 July 1983	2 years, 33 days	U.S. Air Force
14	Richard L. Lawson	General; Richard L. Lawson (1929–2020)	28 July 1983	20 November 1986	3 years, 115 days	U.S. Air Force
15	Thomas C. Richards	General; Thomas C. Richards (1930–2020)	20 November 1986	September 1989	~2 years, 285 days	U.S. Air Force
16	James P. McCarthy	General; James P. McCarthy (born 1935)	September 1989	October 1992	~3 years, 30 days	U.S. Air Force
17	Charles G. Boyd	General; Charles G. Boyd (1938–2022)	October 1992	July 1995	~2 years, 290 days	U.S. Air Force
18	James L. Jamerson	General; James L. Jamerson (born 1941)	18 July 1995	13 July 1998	2 years, 360 days	U.S. Air Force
19	Charles S. Abbot	Admiral; Charles S. Abbot (born 1945)	13 July 1998	2 August 2000	2 years, 20 days	U.S. Navy
20	Carlton W. Fulford Jr.	General; Carlton W. Fulford Jr. (born 1944)	2 August 2000	2 December 2002	2 years, 122 days	U.S. Marine Corps
As Deputy Commander, United States European Command
21	Charles F. Wald	General; Charles F. Wald (born 1948)	2 December 2002	3 May 2006	3 years, 152 days	U.S. Air Force
22	William E. Ward	General; William E. Ward (born 1949)	3 May 2006	1 October 2007	1 year, 151 days	U.S. Army
23	Richard K. Gallagher	Vice Admiral; Richard K. Gallagher (born 1952)	1 October 2007	2009	~1 year, 92 days	U.S. Navy
24	John D. Gardner	Lieutenant General; John D. Gardner	2009	2 April 2012	~3 years, 92 days	U.S. Army
25	Charles W. Martoglio	Vice Admiral; Charles W. Martoglio (born 1956)	~2 April 2012	17 July 2014	~2 years, 106 days	U.S. Navy
26	William B. Garrett III	Lieutenant General; William B. Garrett III	17 July 2014	November 2016	~2 years, 107 days	U.S. Army
27	Timothy M. Ray	Lieutenant General; Timothy M. Ray	November 2016	August 2018	~1 year, 273 days	U.S. Air Force
28	Stephen M. Twitty	Lieutenant General; Stephen M. Twitty (born 1963)	August 2018	July 2020	~1 year, 335 days	U.S. Army
29	Michael L. Howard	Lieutenant General; Michael L. Howard	21 July 2020	~2 August 2022	2 years, 12 days	U.S. Army
30	Steven L. Basham	Lieutenant General; Steven L. Basham	~2 August 2022	15 July 2024	1 year, 348 days	U.S. Air Force
31	Robert C. Fulford	Lieutenant General; Robert C. Fulford	December 2024	~4 August 2026	~1 year, 232 days	U.S. Marine Corps
-	Russell D. Driggers	Major General; Russell D. Driggers (born c. 1973); Acting	~4 August 2026	12 November 2026	~100 days	U.S. Air Force
32	Curtis D. Taylor	Lieutenant General; Curtis D. Taylor	12 November 2026	Incumbent	8 days	U.S. Army

=== Senior enlisted leaders ===
No.	Senior Enlisted Leader		Term			Service branch
No.	Portrait	Name	Took office	Left office	Duration	Service branch
1	James E. Walthes	Command Sergeant Major; James E. Walthes	1 December 1996	1 November 1998	1 year, 335 days	U.S. Army
2	Richard A. Young	Command Sergeant Major; Richard A. Young	1 March 2000	15 May 2001	1 year, 75 days	U.S. Army
3	Phillip J. Kiniery Jr.	Command Sergeant Major; Phillip J. Kiniery Jr.	15 May 2001	1 March 2002	290 days	U.S. Army
4	John M. Mersino	Sergeant Major; John M. Mersino	29 March 2002	8 February 2005	2 years, 316 days	U.S. Marine Corps
5	Michael Bartelle	Command Sergeant Major; Michael Bartelle	8 February 2005	25 September 2006	1 year, 229 days	U.S. Army
6	Mark L. Farley	Command Sergeant Major; Mark L. Farley	25 September 2006	8 May 2009	2 years, 225 days	U.S. Army
7	Roy M. Maddocks Jr.	Fleet Master Chief; Roy M. Maddocks Jr.	8 May 2009	14 August 2013	4 years, 98 days	U.S. Navy
8	Craig A. Adams	Chief Master Sergeant; Craig A. Adams	14 August 2013	15 September 2015	2 years, 32 days	U.S. Air Force
–	James E. Davis	Chief Master Sergeant; James E. Davis; Acting	15 September 2015	May 2016	~229 days	U.S. Air Force
9	Crispian D. Addington	Fleet Master Chief; Crispian D. Addington	May 2016	2 August 2019	~3 years, 93 days	U.S. Navy
10	Phillip L. Easton	Chief Master Sergeant; Phillip L. Easton	2 August 2019	7 June 2022	2 years, 309 days	U.S. Air Force
11	Robert V. Abernethy	Command Sergeant Major; Robert V. Abernethy	7 June 2022	17 June 2025	3 years, 10 days	U.S. Army
12	Thomas J. Holland	Command Sergeant Major; Thomas J. Holland	17 June 2025	Incumbent	1 year, 156 days	U.S. Army

=== Chiefs of staff ===
No.	Chief of Staff		Term			Service branch
No.	Portrait	Name	Took office	Left office	Duration	Service branch
–	Frederic J. Brown	Brigadier General; Frederic J. Brown (1905–1971); Acting	1 August 1952	25 August 1952	24 days	U.S. Army
1	Robert Kinder Taylor	Major General; Robert Kinder Taylor (1902–1976)	25 August 1952	June 1953	~280 days	U.S. Air Force
2	James W. Spry	Major General; James W. Spry (1900–1983)	23 August 1953	June 1954	~282 days	U.S. Air Force
3	Charles D. Palmer	Major General; Charles D. Palmer (1902–1999)	7 July 1954	21 September 1955	1 year, 76 days	U.S. Army
4	George Honnen	Major General; George Honnen (1897–1974)	21 September 1955	March 1957	~1 year, 161 days	U.S. Army
5	Glenn O. Barcus	Lieutenant General; Glenn O. Barcus (1903–1990)	1 April 1957	1 July 1960	3 years, 91 days	U.S. Air Force
6	Edward H. Underhill	Lieutenant General; Edward H. Underhill (1907–1983)	1 July 1960	1 June 1963	2 years, 335 days	U.S. Air Force
7	Russell L. Vittrup	Lieutenant General; Russell L. Vittrup (1906–1992)	1 June 1963	1 June 1965	2 years, 0 days	U.S. Army
8	John W. Bowen	Lieutenant General; John W. Bowen	1 June 1965	26 July 1968	3 years, 55 days	U.S. Army
9	John A. Tyree Jr.	Vice Admiral; John A. Tyree Jr. (1911–2004)	26 July 1968	December 1969	~1 year, 128 days	U.S. Navy
10	Alexander D. Surles Jr.	Lieutenant General; Alexander D. Surles Jr. (1916–1995)	1 January 1970	July 1971	~1 year, 181 days	U.S. Army
11	James W. Sutherland Jr.	Lieutenant General; James W. Sutherland Jr. (1918–1987)	2 July 1971	July 1974	~2 years, 364 days	U.S. Army
12	William A. Knowlton	Lieutenant General; William A. Knowlton (1920–2018)	6 August 1974	May 1976	~1 year, 269 days	U.S. Army
13	Rolland V. Heiser	Lieutenant General; Rolland V. Heiser (1925–2016)	15 September 1976	31 October 1978	2 years, 46 days	U.S. Army
14	Robert C. McAlister	Lieutenant General; Robert C. McAlister (1923–2008)	31 October 1978	1 August 1980	1 year, 275 days	U.S. Army
15	Robert Haldane	Lieutenant General; Robert Haldane (1924–2008)	1 August 1980	July 1982	~1 year, 334 days	U.S. Army
16	Howard F. Stone	Lieutenant General; Howard F. Stone (born 1931)	August 1982	June 1985	~2 years, 304 days	U.S. Army
17	Howard G. Crowell Jr.	Lieutenant General; Howard G. Crowell Jr. (born 1932)	June 1985	~20 July 1988	~3 years, 49 days	U.S. Army
18	Edwin S. Leland Jr.	Lieutenant General; Edwin S. Leland Jr.	20 July 1988	1 July 1991	2 years, 346 days	U.S. Army
19	Robert D. Chelberg	Lieutenant General; Robert D. Chelberg	1 July 1991	4 June 1993	1 year, 338 days	U.S. Army
20	Richard F. Keller	Lieutenant General; Richard F. Keller	4 June 1993	1 December 1996	3 years, 180 days	U.S. Army
21	David L. Benton III	Lieutenant General; David L. Benton III	1 December 1996	1 November 1998	1 year, 335 days	U.S. Army
22	Michael Canavan	Lieutenant General; Michael Canavan	1 November 1998	2 November 2000	2 years, 1 day	U.S. Army
23	Daniel J. Petrosky	Lieutenant General; Daniel J. Petrosky	2 November 2000	4 November 2002	2 years, 2 days	U.S. Army
24	John B. Sylvester	Lieutenant General; John B. Sylvester (born 1946)	4 November 2002	2 August 2004	1 year, 272 days	U.S. Army
25	Colby M. Broadwater III	Lieutenant General; Colby M. Broadwater III	3 August 2004	3 May 2006	1 year, 273 days	U.S. Army
26	William D. Catto	Major General; William D. Catto	5 July 2006	~July 2008	~1 year, 362 days	U.S. Marine Corps
27	Ken Keen	Major General; Ken Keen	July 2008	~June 2010	~1 year, 335 days	U.S. Army
28	Charles W. Martoglio	Rear Admiral; Charles W. Martoglio (born 1956)	~June 2010	April 2012	~1 year, 305 days	U.S. Navy
29	Mark A. Barrett	Major General; Mark A. Barrett	April 2012	February 2014	~1 year, 306 days	U.S. Air Force
30	John N. Christenson	Rear Admiral; John N. Christenson (born 1958)	February 2014	August 2015	~1 year, 181 days	U.S. Navy
31	John W. Smith Jr.	Rear Admiral; John W. Smith Jr.	August 2015	June 2018	~2 years, 304 days	U.S. Navy
32	Patrick A. Piercey	Rear Admiral; Patrick A. Piercey	June 2018	August 2020	~2 years, 61 days	U.S. Navy
33	David J. Julazadeh	Major General; David J. Julazadeh	August 2020	July 2021	~304 days	U.S. Air Force
34	John D. Lamontagne	Major General; John D. Lamontagne	July 2021	June 2022	~364 days	U.S. Air Force
35	Adrian L. Spain	Major General; Adrian L. Spain	July 2022	24 July 2023	~1 year, 23 days	U.S. Air Force
36	Peter B. Andrysiak Jr.	Major General; Peter B. Andrysiak Jr.	24 July 2023	30 June 2025	1 year, 341 days	U.S. Army
37	John L. Rafferty Jr.	Major General; John L. Rafferty Jr.	30 July 2025	~March 2026	~228 days	U.S. Army
38	Russell D. Driggers	Major General; Russell D. Driggers (born c. 1973)	March 2026	Incumbent	~250 days	U.S. Air Force

== See also ==
- Leadership of the United States Africa Command
- Leadership of the United States Northern Command
- Leadership of the United States Space Command
