= Charles Corcoran =

U.S. Air Force general

Charles S. Corcoran
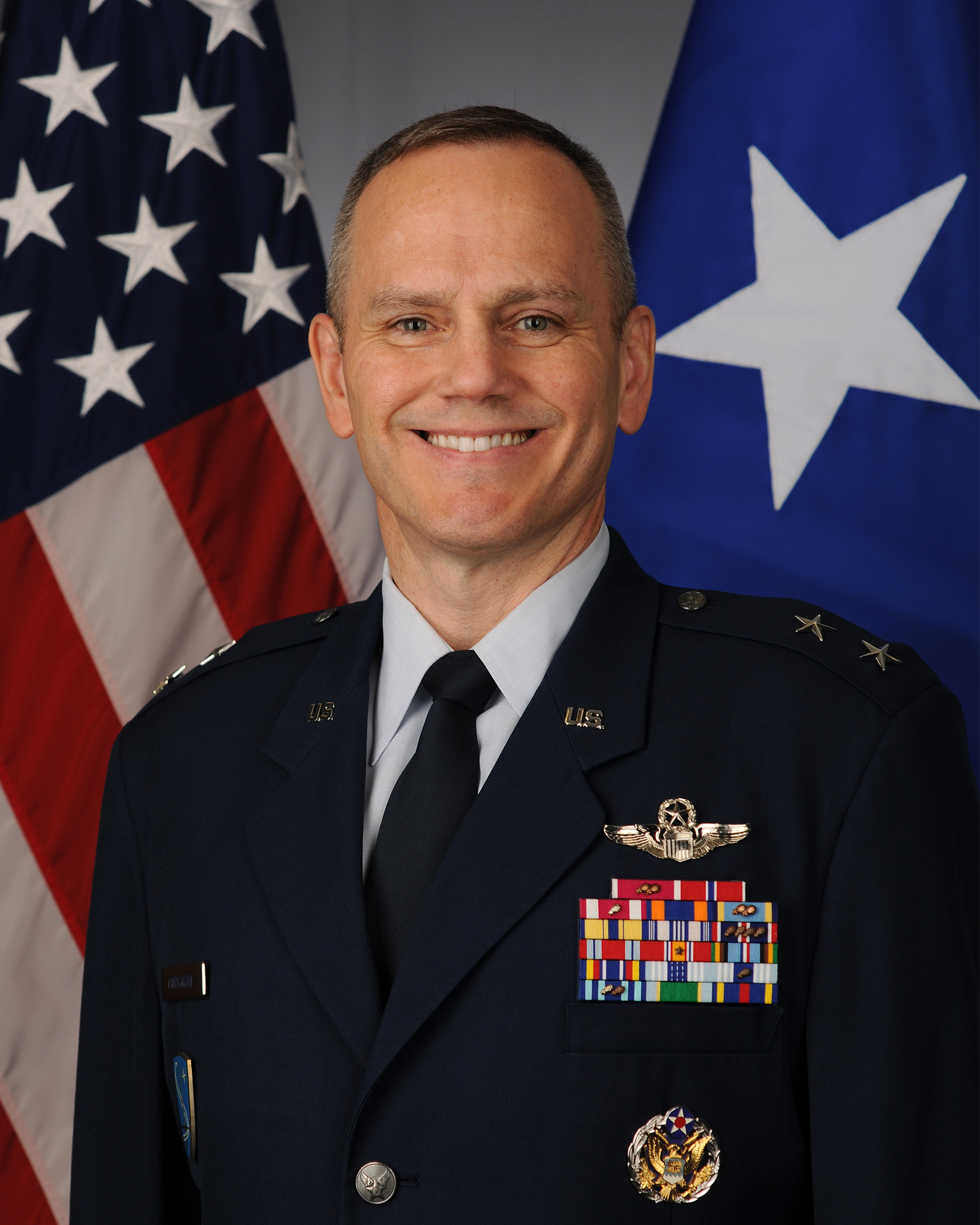
- Born: Chillicothe, Ohio, U.S.
- Military career
- Allegiance: United States
- Branch: United States Air Force
- Service years: 1992–2022
- Rank: Major General
- Commands: United States Air Force Warfare Center; 380th Air Expeditionary Wing; 3rd Wing; 325th Operations Group; 525th Fighter Squadron
- Awards: Legion of Merit (3); Bronze Star Medal

Charles Seth Corcoran is a retired United States Air Force major general who last served as the acting deputy chief of staff for operations of the United States Air Force from July 2022 to December 2022, and most recently served as the assistant deputy chief of staff for operations from July 2021 to July 2022. He also served as the commander of the United States Air Force Warfare Center. Previously, he was the director of operations, strategic deterrence and nuclear integration of the United States Air Forces in Europe – Air Forces Africa.

Military offices
Preceded by David S. Nahom	Commander of the 3rd Wing; 2014–2016	Succeeded by Christopher J. Niemi
Preceded by Daniel J. Orcutt	Commander of the 380th Air Expeditionary Wing; 2016–2017	Succeeded by Derek France
Preceded by Kevin Huyck	Deputy Chief of Staff for Operations of the NATO Allied Air Command; 2017–2018	Succeeded by Andrew P. Hansen
Preceded by Jon T. Thomas	Director of Operations, Strategic Deterrence and Nuclear Integration of the United States Air Forces in Europe – Air Forces Africa; 2018–2019	Succeeded by Michael Koscheski
Preceded by David W. Snoddy; Acting	Commander of the United States Air Force Warfare Center; 2019–2021	Succeeded by Case Cunningham
Preceded by Russell L. Mack	Assistant Deputy Chief of Staff for Operations of the United States Air Force; 2021–2022	Succeeded by David J. Meyer
Preceded by Joseph T. Guastella Jr.	Deputy Chief of Staff for Operations of the United States Air Force; Acting; 2022	Succeeded by James C. Slife
