= David A. Harris Jr. =

U.S. Air Force general

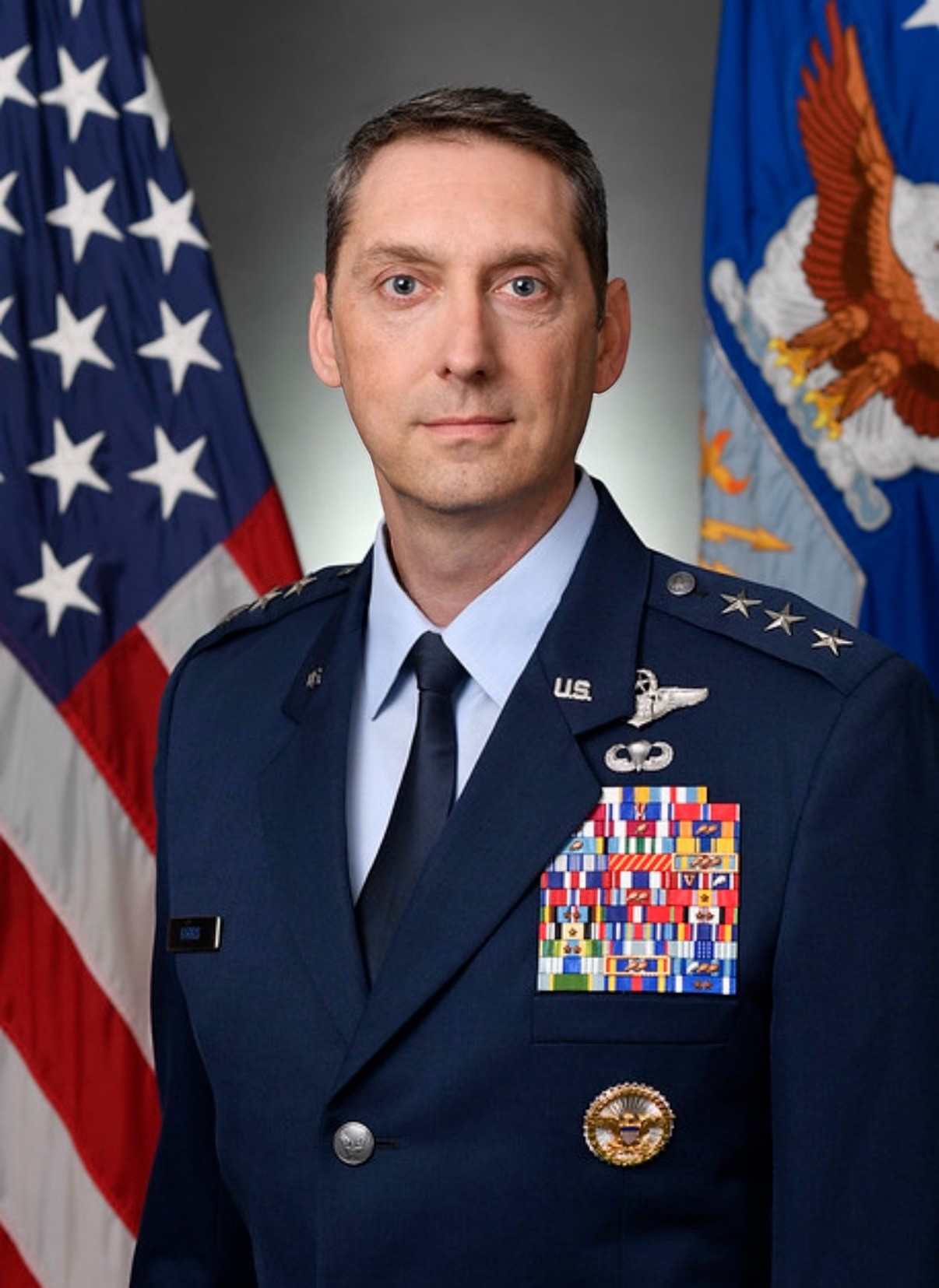
- Official portrait, 2026
- Military career
- Allegiance: United States
- Branch: United States Air Force
- Service years: 1993–2026
- Rank: Lieutenant General
- Commands: Integration and Innovation Center; 1st Expeditionary Special Operations Wing; 449th Air Expeditionary Group; 550th Special Operations Squadron
- Conflicts: War in Afghanistan; Iraq War
- Awards: Air Force Distinguished Service Medal; Defense Superior Service Medal; Legion of Merit (2); Distinguished Flying Cross; Bronze Star Medal

David A. Harris Jr. is a retired United States Air Force lieutenant general who serves as the deputy chief of staff for Air Force Futures of the United States Air Force. He previously served as a special assistant to the chief of staff of the United States Air Force.

== Military career ==
In April 2023, Harris was nominated for promotion to lieutenant general and assignment as deputy chief of staff for Air Force Futures.

Military offices
Preceded by Douglas Lamberth	Vice Superintendent of the United States Air Force Academy; 2016–2018	Succeeded by Houston Cantwell
Preceded by Sean M. Farrell	Director of Strategic Plans, Programs, and Requirements of the Air Force Special Operations Command; 2018–2020	Succeeded by Steven G. Edwards
Preceded by Michael Fantini	Commander of the Integration and Innovation Center; 2020–2022	Succeeded by Daniel A. DeVoe
Preceded by David J. Meyer	Deputy Commander of the Ninth Air Force; Serving with: Clark Quinn; 2022–2023	Succeeded by Mark H. Slocum
Preceded by S. Clinton Hinote	Deputy Chief of Staff for Air Force Futures of the United States Air Force; 2023–2026	Succeeded by Christopher J. Niemi
