= Alexus Grynkewich =

American general (born 1971)

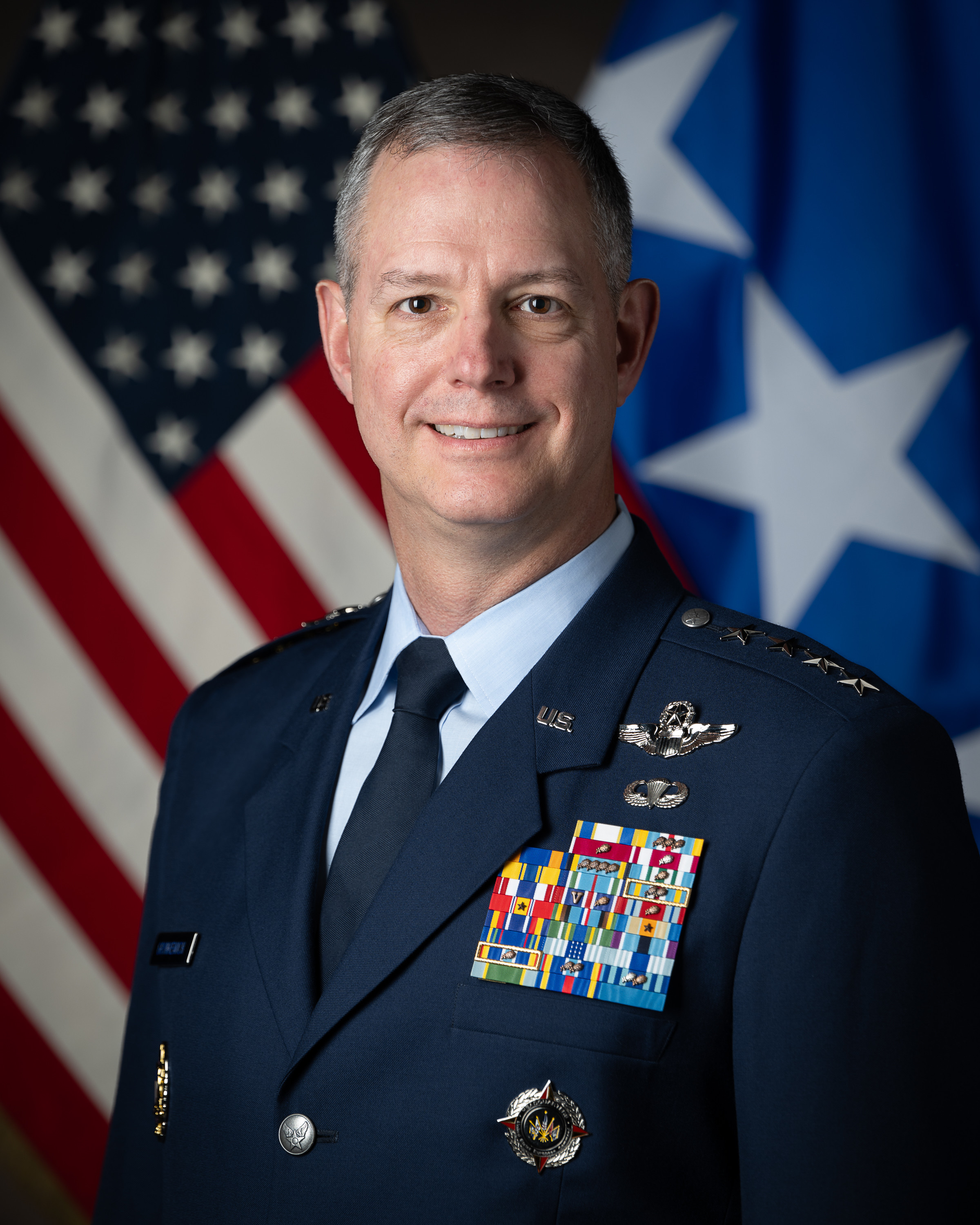
- Official portrait, 2025
- Born: Alexus Gregory Grynkewich; October 15, 1971 (age 54)
- Education: United States Air Force Academy (BS); University of Georgia (MA); Naval Postgraduate School (MA); National Defense University (MS)
- Military career
- Allegiance: United States
- Branch: United States Air Force
- Service years: 1993–present
- Rank: General
- Nickname: "Grynch"
- Commands: United States European Command; Supreme Allied Commander Europe; United States Air Forces Central; Ninth Air Force; 53rd Wing; 49th Operations Support Squadron
- Conflicts: War against the Islamic State; Operation Inherent Resolve; 2024 Iran–Israel conflict; April 2024 Iranian strikes against Israel
- Awards: Air Force Distinguished Service Medal; Defense Superior Service Medal (4); Legion of Merit (2)

Alexus Gregory Grynkewich (born October 15, 1971) is an American general who has served as the commander of United States European Command and the Supreme Allied Commander Europe since 2025.

Grynkewich graduated from the United States Air Force Academy in 1993. During his career in the U.S. Air Force, Grynkewich was an F-16 Fighting Falcon and F-22 Raptor pilot, and has over 2,300 flight hours. His senior posts have included commander of the 53rd Wing and deputy commander for operations of the Operation Inherent Resolve Combined Joint Task Force, which was heavily involved in the war against the Islamic State.

Grynkewich was the director of operations of the U.S. Central Command from 2020 to 2022, and the commander of the Ninth Air Force from 2022 to 2024. After the October 7 attacks in Israel, he oversaw airstrikes in response to the targeting of U.S. forces by Iranian proxy groups, and the interception of the April 2024 Iranian strikes against Israel. Grynkewich was then the director for operations of the Joint Staff from 2024 to 2025, during which time he was involved in the U.S. support to Ukraine.

== Early life and education ==
Alexus Gregory Grynkewich was born on October 15, 1971 and is an American of Belarusian descent. His great-grandfather Elias (Ilya) Grynkevitch immigrated to the United States in 1899 from Minsk, then located in the Russian Empire. His father, Gregory Wayne Grynkewich (1949–2012), was a scientist and inventor. His mother, Linda Craine Grynkewich (born 1950), is a scientist, educator, and writer.

Grynkewich graduated from the Georgia Military College Preparatory School in 1989, and was commissioned as a second lieutenant from the United States Air Force Academy in 1993 after graduating with a Bachelor of Science degree in military history. In 1994 Grynkewich also obtained a Master of Arts degree in history from the University of Georgia. From September 1994 to August 1996 he underwent pilot training at the Vance Air Force Base in Oklahoma and the Luke Air Force Base in Arizona. In addition, his later education included the Squadron Officer School in 1997, the Air Command and Staff College in 2003, the Naval Postgraduate School and the Air War College in 2006, and the Joint Advanced Warfighting School at National Defense University in 2010, among other courses.

== Military career ==
In September 1996 he became an F-16 pilot and the squadron chief of training for 18th Fighter Squadron at Eielson Air Force Base, Alaska. He held that role until July 1999, and in the following month Grynkewich was appointed as an F-16 instructor pilot, flight commander, and evaluator in the 421st Fighter Squadron at Hill Air Force Base, Utah until December 2001. From January 2002 to January 2003 he was an F-16C instructor pilot and the chief of weapons for 80th Fighter Squadron at Kunsan Air Base in South Korea. Starting in February 2003 Grynkewich became an operation test and evaluation instructor pilot for the F-16C and the F-22A at the 422d Test and Evaluation Squadron, then chief of F-22A evaluation for the 53rd Test and Evaluation Group, and director of operations at the 59th Test and Evaluation Squadron. During his time as a pilot, Grynkewich achieved the rating of command pilot and has over 2,300 flight hours.

In September 2005 he began studies at the Naval Postgraduate School, and following graduation, from January to December 2007 he worked at Air Combat Command in several roles. Grynkewich was then the commander of the 49th Operations Support Squadron from January 2008 to June 2009. After that he attended the Joint Advanced Warfighting School, where he received a Master of Science degree. Between July 2010 and May 2012 Grynkewich worked at the Headquarters, U.S. European Command, in Germany, including as the Chief of the Plans Division. From June 2012 he was vice commander of the 57th Wing at Nellis Air Force Base, Nevada, and from May 2013 he was commander of the 53rd Wing at Eglin Air Force Base, Florida. In June 2015 Grynkewich was appointed to Headquarters, U.S. Air Force, at The Pentagon, serving as the Chief of the Strategic Planning Integration Division. In that role he was responsible for working on the Air Force's 30-year Resource Allocation Plan. In June 2016 he became Deputy Director for Operations, Operations Team Three, at the Joint Staff, and then the Deputy Director, Global Operations, at Operations (J3), Joint Staff.

=== General officer ===
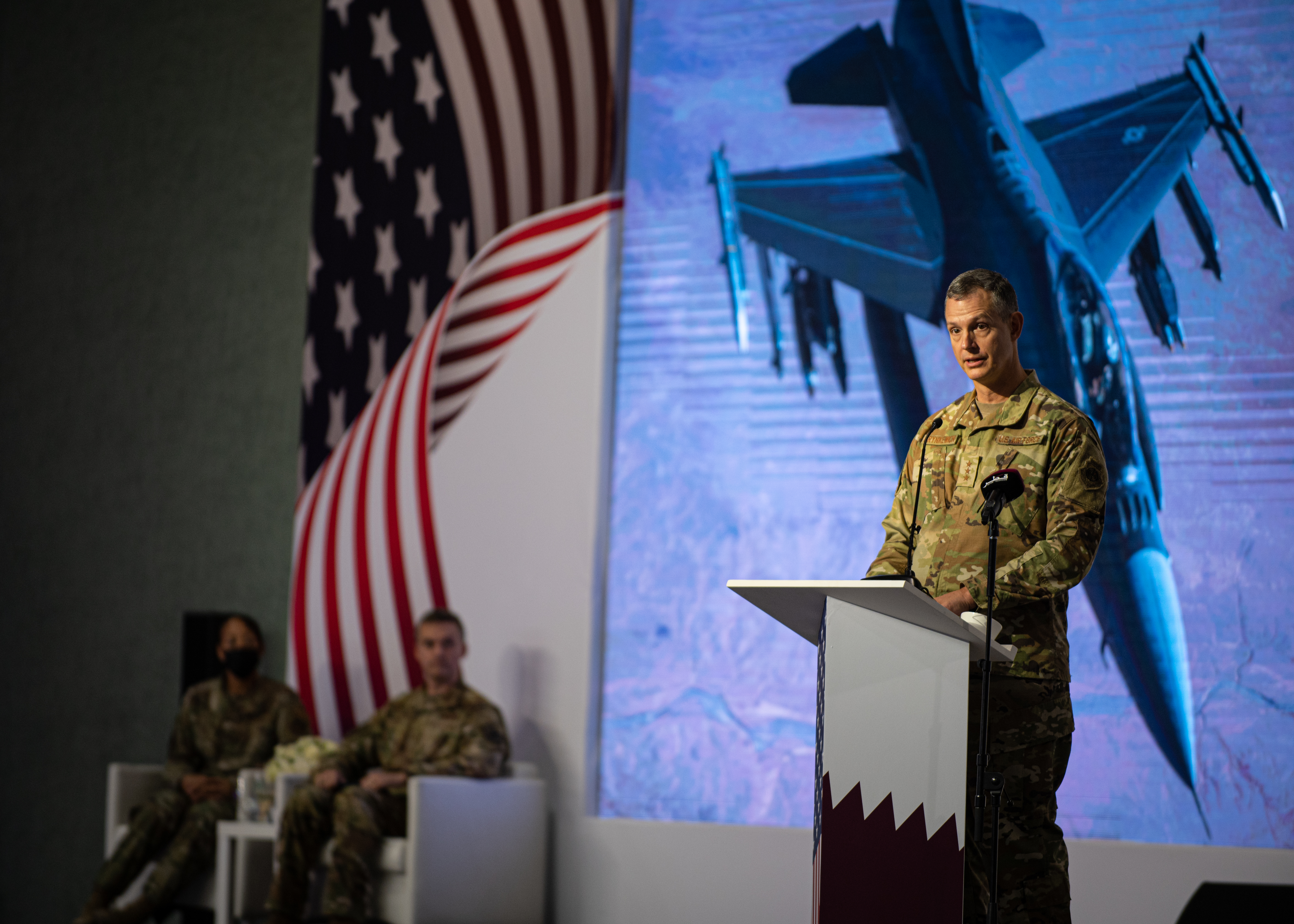
Grynkewich speaking at the Air Forces Central change of command ceremony, Al Udeid Air Base, July 2022

Between April 2019 and May 2020 he served as Deputy Commander for Operations, Combined Joint Task Force – Operation Inherent Resolve, and as Commander, 9th Air Expeditionary Group. In this role he took part in the U.S. campaign against the Islamic State in Iraq and Syria, working closely with the Iraqi security forces and the Syrian Democratic Forces.

In June 2020 Grynkewich became the director of operations at the United States Central Command, until June 2022, and in the following month he became commander, Ninth Air Force and U.S. Air Forces Central. As commander of Air Forces Central, Grynkewich oversaw all U.S. air operations in the Middle East, including strikes on Iranian proxy groups to protect U.S. forces from attack, and helping intercept the April 2024 Iranian strikes against Israel, the latter happening just days before he turned over command to his successor.

In January 2024, Grynkewich was nominated for assignment as director for operations of the Joint Staff. He completed his assignment at Central Command in April 2024 and took up the post of director for operations at The Pentagon in May. During his tenure, he worked on the U.S. support to Ukraine during the Russo-Ukrainian war.

=== EUCOM and NATO commander ===
In June 2025, Grynkewich was nominated for promotion to general and assignment as the commander of United States European Command and Supreme Allied Commander Europe. He is the first officer in recent history appointed to that position from a three-star role instead of already being a four-star general. Grynkewich took command of EUCOM in a ceremony on July 1, 2025, and became the Supreme Allied Commander Europe on July 4, succeeding Army General Christopher G. Cavoli.

In February 2026 Grynkewich participated in negotiations in Abu Dhabi involving American, Russian, and Ukrainian officials, during which it was agreed to restore military-to-military communication between the U.S. and Russia, which had been suspended since late 2021. Before that, in his role as commander of NATO forces, Grynkewich also had the authority to be in contact with the Russian Chief of the General Staff, Valery Gerasimov, for deescalation purposes.

== Awards and decorations ==

USAF Command Pilot wings
U.S Army Basic Parachutist Badge
U.S Air Force Distinguished Service Medal
Defense Superior Service Medal with three bronze oak leaf clusters	Legion of Merit with bronze oak leaf cluster	Meritorious Service Medal with silver oak leaf cluster
Air Medal	Aerial Achievement Medal with four bronze oak leaf clusters	Joint Service Commendation Medal with bronze oak leaf cluster
Air and Space Commendation Medal	Joint Service Achievement Medal with bronze oak leaf cluster	Joint Meritorious Unit Award with two oak leaf clusters
Air Force Meritorious Unit Award	Air and Space Outstanding Unit Award with "V" device and bronze oak leaf cluster	Combat Readiness Medal with bronze oak leaf cluster
National Defense Service Medal with bronze service star	Armed Forces Expeditionary Medal	Inherent Resolve Campaign Medal with bronze service star
Global War on Terrorism Service Medal	Korea Defense Service Medal	Humanitarian Service Medal
Nuclear Deterrence Operations Service Medal	Air and Space Overseas Short Tour Service Ribbon	Air and Space Overseas Long Tour Service Ribbon
Air Force Expeditionary Service Ribbon w/ 1 oak leaf cluster and gold frame	Air and Space Expeditionary Service Ribbon with two bronze oak leaf clusters	Air and Space Longevity Service Award w/ 1 silver oak leaf cluster and 1 bronze oak leaf cluster
Small Arms Expert Marksmanship Ribbon	Air Force Training Ribbon	United Nation Headquarters medal
United States European Command insignia
SACEUR Badge

== Dates of promotion ==
Rank	Branch	Date
Second lieutenant	Air Force	2 June 1993
First lieutenant	Air Force	2 June 1995
Captain	Air Force	2 June 1997
Major	Air Force	1 August 2003
Lieutenant colonel	Air Force	1 September 2007
Colonel	Air Force	1 September 2011
Brigadier general	Air Force	24 May 2017
Major general	Air Force	1 December 2019
Lieutenant general	Air Force	21 July 2022
General	Air Force	1 July 2025

Military offices
Preceded by David W. Hicks	Commander of the 53rd Wing; 2013–2015	Succeeded by Adrian Spain
Preceded by Gregory Guillot	Commander of the Ninth Air Force; 2022–2024	Succeeded by Derek France
Preceded by Douglas Sims	Director for Operations of the Joint Staff; 2024–2025	Succeeded by David Odom
Preceded by Christopher G. Cavoli	Commander of the United States European Command; Supreme Allied Commander Europe; 2025–present	Incumbent
U.S. order of precedence (ceremonial)
Preceded by Randall Reed as Commander of U.S. Transportation Command	Order of precedence of the United States as Commander of U.S. European Command	Succeeded by Brad Cooper as Commander of U.S. Central Command
