= Michael Koscheski =

U.S. Air Force general

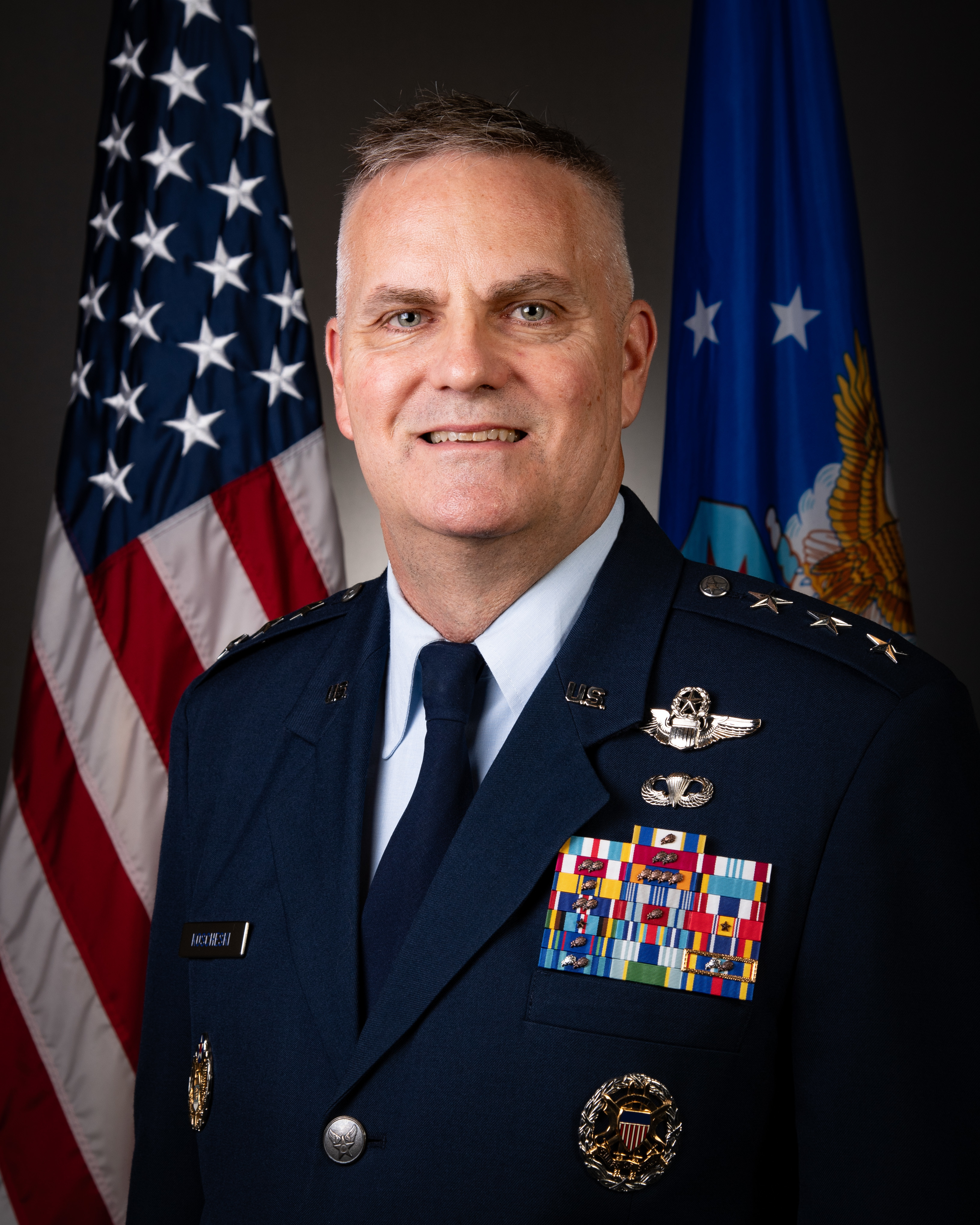
- Born: Dallas, Texas, U.S.
- Military career
- Allegiance: United States
- Branch: United States Air Force
- Service years: 1992–2026
- Rank: Lieutenant General
- Commands: Fifteenth Air Force; 332nd Air Expeditionary Wing; 4th Operations Group; 389th Fighter Squadron
- Awards: Air Force Distinguished Service Medal (2); Defense Superior Service Medal; Legion of Merit (3)

Michael Gary Koscheski is a United States Air Force lieutenant general who has served as the deputy commander of Air Combat Command. He previously served as commander of the Fifteenth Air Force and deputy commander of the Ninth Air Force.

== Military career ==
In May 2023, Koscheski was nominated for promotion to lieutenant general and assignment as the deputy commander of Air Combat Command.

Military offices
New office	Commander of the 332nd Air Expeditionary Wing; 2015–2016	Succeeded by Clinton W. Eichelberger
Preceded by ???	Chief of Strategic Planning Integration of the United States Air Force; 2016–2017	Succeeded by Clark Quinn
New office	Director for Aircrew Crisis Task Force of the United States Air Force; 2017–2018	Succeeded by Christopher Short
Preceded by Dieter Bareihs	Director of Plans, Programs, and Analyses of the United States Air Forces in Europe – Air Forces Africa; 2018–2019	Succeeded by Adrian Spain
Preceded by Charles Corcoran	Director of Operations, Strategic Deterrence, and Nuclear Integration of the United States Air Forces in Europe – Air Forces Africa; 2019–2020	Succeeded by Derek France
Preceded by B. Chance Saltzman	Deputy Commander of the Ninth Air Force; 2020–2021	Succeeded by David J. Meyer
Preceded by Chad P. Franks	Commander of the Fifteenth Air Force; 2021–2024	Succeeded by David B. Lyons
Preceded by Russell L. Mack	Deputy Commander of Air Combat Command; 2024–2026	Succeeded by Larry R. Broadwell Jr.
