= James C. Slife =

US Air Force general (born 1967)

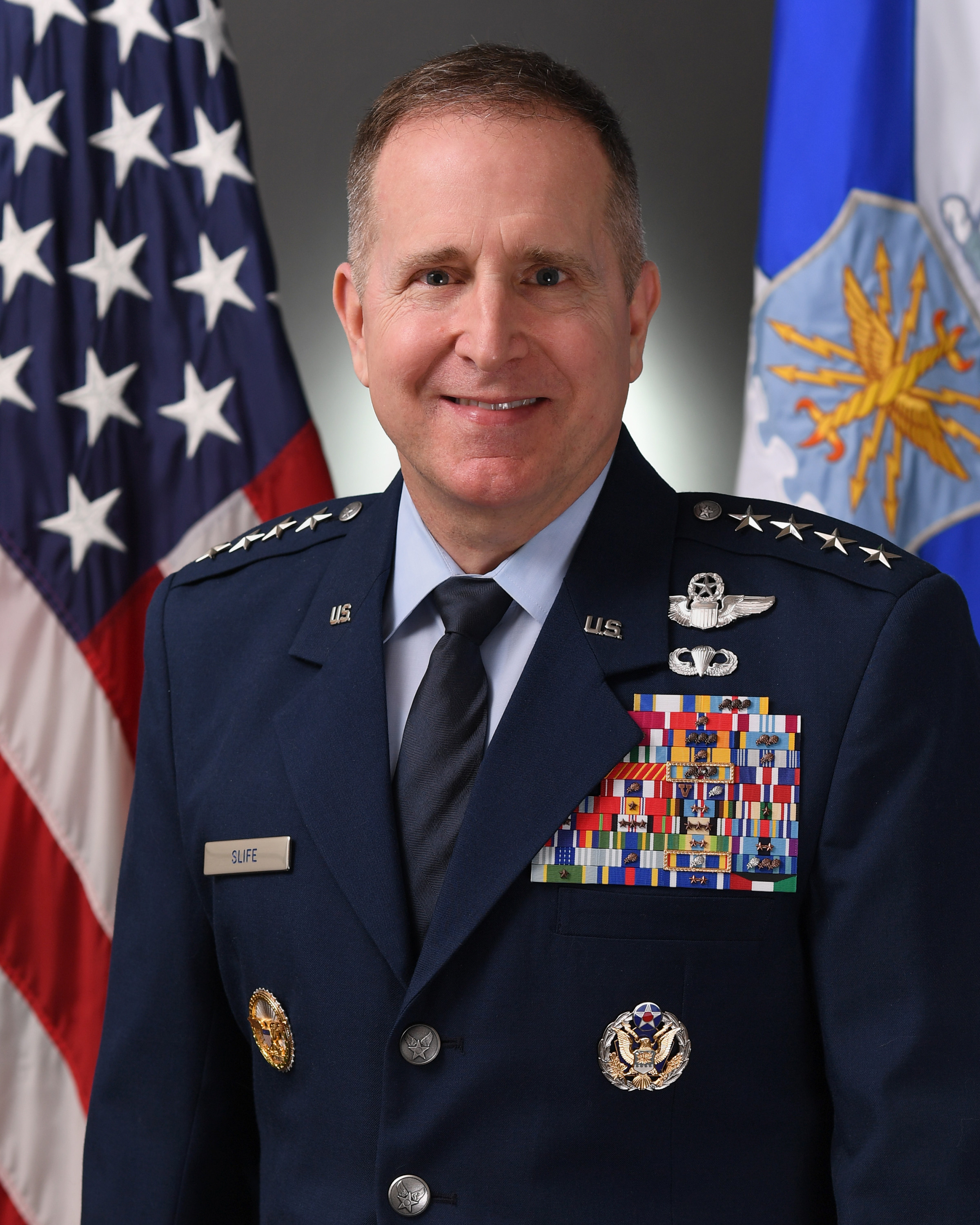
- Born: 1967 (age 58–59); Michigan, U.S.
- Military career
- Allegiance: United States
- Branch: United States Air Force
- Service years: 1989–2025
- Rank: General
- Commands: Air Force Special Operations Command; 1st Special Operations Wing; Joint Special Operations Aviation Detachment-Afghanistan; 27th Special Operations Group; Joint Special Operations Aviation Detachment-Arabian Peninsula; 21st Special Operations Squadron
- Conflicts: Gulf War; War in Afghanistan; Iraq War
- Awards: Air Force Distinguished Service Medal; Defense Superior Service Medal (4); Legion of Merit; Bronze Star Medal (2)

James C. Slife (born 1967) is a retired United States Air Force four-star general who served as the vice chief of staff of the United States Air Force from 19 December 2023 to 21 February 2025. He previously served as the deputy chief of staff for operations of the United States Air Force from December 2022 to December 2023.

He served as the commander of Air Force Special Operations Command from June 2019 to December 2022, having previously served as the vice commander from July 2018 to June 2019 and chief of staff of United States Special Operations Command from June 2017 to June 2018. Slife was commissioned through the ROTC program at Auburn University in 1989.

In September 2023, Slife was nominated for promotion to general and appointment as Air Force vice chief of staff. On 21 February 2025, Slife was relieved from that position.

As of 2026, Slife is the chair of the Air Force Historical Foundation board of directors.

== Awards and decorations ==
Personal decorations
	Air Force Distinguished Service Medal
	Defense Superior Service Medal with three bronze oak leaf clusters
Width-44 crimson ribbon with a pair of width-2 white stripes on the edges	Legion of Merit
Width-44 scarlet ribbon with width-4 ultramarine blue stripe at center, surrounded by width-1 white stripes. Width-1 white stripes are at the edges.	Bronze Star Medal with oak leaf cluster
	Defense Meritorious Service Medal
Width-44 crimson ribbon with two width-8 white stripes at distance 4 from the edges.	Meritorious Service Medal with two oak leaf clusters
	Air Medal with three oak leaf clusters
	Aerial Achievement Medal with two oak leaf clusters
	Joint Service Commendation Medal
	Air Force Commendation Medal with oak leaf cluster
	Air Force Achievement Medal with oak leaf cluster
	Air Force Combat Action Medal
Unit awards
	Joint Meritorious Unit Award with four oak leaf clusters
	Gallant Unit Citation
	Air Force Meritorious Unit Award with oak leaf cluster
	Air Force Outstanding Unit Award with Valor device and silver oak leaf cluster
	Air Force Organizational Excellence Award
Service awards
	Combat Readiness Medal with oak leaf cluster
Campaign and service medals
Width=44 scarlet ribbon with a central width-4 golden yellow stripe, flanked by pairs of width-1 scarlet, white, Old Glory blue, and white stripes	National Defense Service Medal with one bronze service star
	Armed Forces Expeditionary Medal with two service stars
	Southwest Asia Service Medal with service star
	Kosovo Campaign Medal with service star
	Afghanistan Campaign Medal with three service stars
	Iraq Campaign Medal with three service stars
	Global War on Terrorism Expeditionary Medal
	Global War on Terrorism Service Medal
	Korea Defense Service Medal
	Armed Forces Service Medal with two service stars
	Humanitarian Service Medal with two service stars
Service, training, and marksmanship awards
	Air Force Overseas Short Tour Service Ribbon
	Air Force Overseas Long Tour Service Ribbon with oak leaf cluster
	Air Force Expeditionary Service Ribbon with gold frame and silver oak leaf cluster
	Air Force Longevity Service Award with one silver and two bronze oak leaf cluster
	Small Arms Expert Marksmanship Ribbon with service star
	Air Force Training Ribbon
Foreign awards
	NATO Medal for the former Yugoslavia with two service stars
	Kuwait Liberation Medal (Kuwait)

Other accoutrements
US Air Force Command Pilot Badge
Basic Parachutist Badge
Office of the Secretary of Defense Identification Badge

== Effective dates of promotion ==
Insignia	Rank	Date
	General	19 December 2023
	Lieutenant general	29 June 2018
	Major general	2 May 2016
	Brigadier general	12 July 2013
	Colonel	1 March 2006
	Lieutenant colonel	1 March 2002
	Major	1 July 1999
	Captain	20 October 1993
	First lieutenant	20 October 1991
	Second lieutenant	9 June 1989

Military offices
Preceded by J. Marcus Hicks	Chief of Staff of the United States Special Operations Command; 2017–2018	Succeeded by James B. Linder
Preceded by Scott A. Howell	Vice Commander of the United States Special Operations Command; 2018–2019	Succeeded by Tony D. Bauernfeind
Preceded by Marshall B. Webb	Commander of the Air Force Special Operations Command; 2019–2022	Succeeded by Tony D. Bauernfeind
Preceded by Charles S. Corcoran; Acting	Deputy Chief of Staff for Operations of the United States Air Force; 2022–2023	Succeeded by Mark H. Slocum; Acting
Preceded by David W. Allvin	Vice Chief of Staff of the United States Air Force; 2023–2025	Succeeded by Scott L. Pleus; Acting
