= David B. Lyons =

U.S. Air Force general

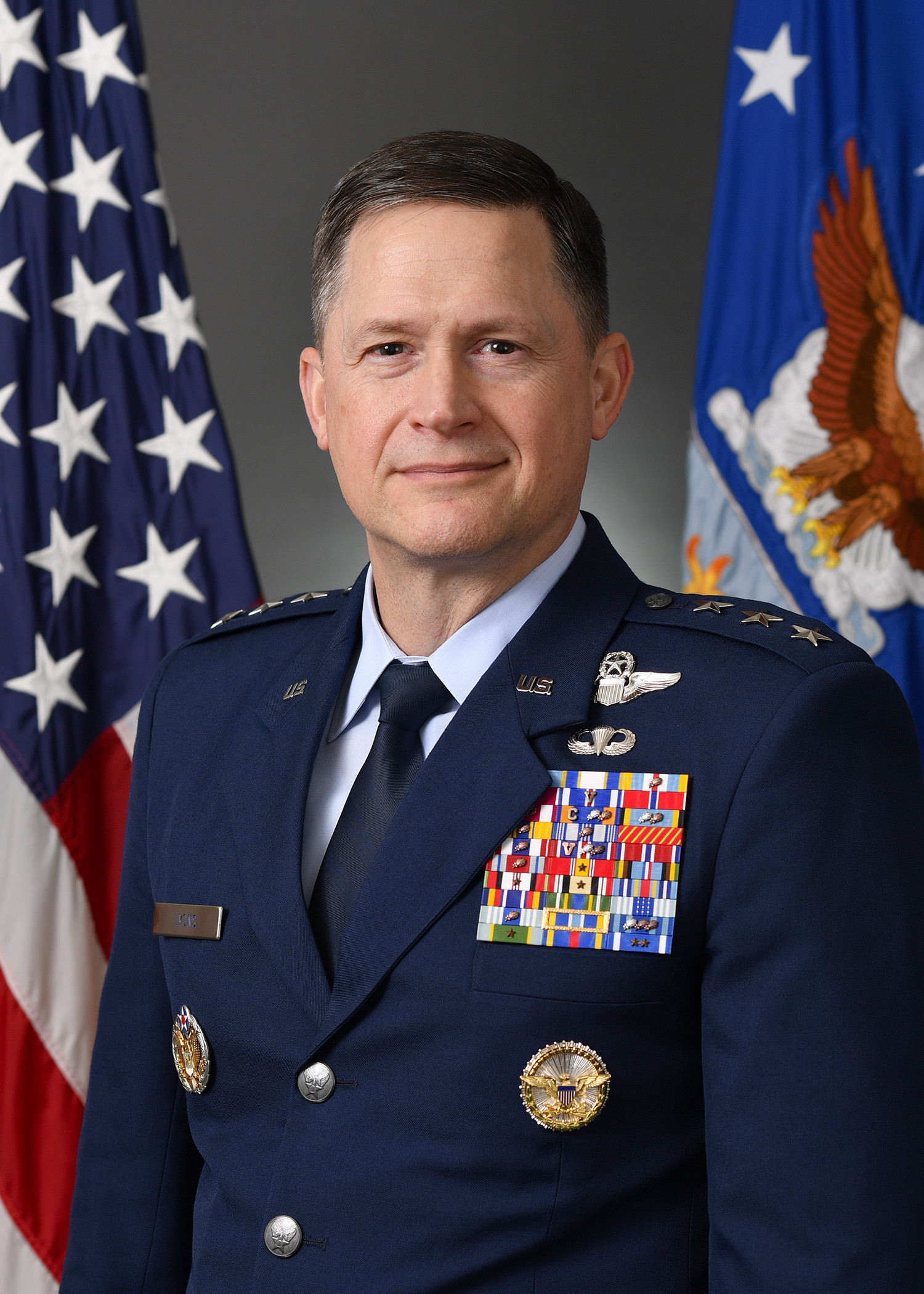
- Official portrait, 2025
- Military career
- Allegiance: United States
- Branch: United States Air Force
- Service years: 1993–present
- Rank: Lieutenant General
- Commands: Inspector General of the Department of the Air Force; Fifteenth Air Force; 455th Air Expeditionary Wing; 388th Fighter Wing; 52nd Operations Group
- Awards: Defense Superior Service Medal (2); Legion of Merit (3)

David B. Lyons is a United States Air Force Lieutenant general who served as the Inspector General of the Department of the Air Force. He previously served as the commander of the Fifteenth Air Force and director of air and space operations of the Air Combat Command.

== Military career ==
Lyons has commanded the 455th Air Expeditionary Wing. In February 2021, he was nominated for promotion to major general.

Military offices
Preceded by Lance K. Landrum	Commander of the 388th Fighter Wing; 2015–2017	Succeeded by Lee E. Kloos
Preceded by Jay Bickley	Vice Commander of the 12th Air Force; 2017–2018	Succeeded by Craig Baker
Preceded by Craig R. Baker	Commander of the 455th Air Expeditionary Wing; 2018–2019	Succeeded by R. Scott Jobe
Preceded by Matthew McFarlane	Senior Military Assistant to the Deputy Secretary of Defense; 2019–2021	Succeeded by Christian F. Wortman
Preceded by Paul J. Murray	Inspector General of the Air Combat Command; 2021–2022	Succeeded by Travolis A. Simmons
Preceded by Mark Slocum	Director of Air and Space Operations of the Air Combat Command; 2022–2023	Succeeded by David G. Shoemaker
Preceded by Michael G. Koscheski	Commander of the Fifteenth Air Force; 2023–2025	Succeeded by Steven Behmer
Preceded by Stephen L. Davis	Inspector General of the Department of the Air Force; 2025–present	Incumbent
