= Russell L. Mack =

U.S. Air Force general

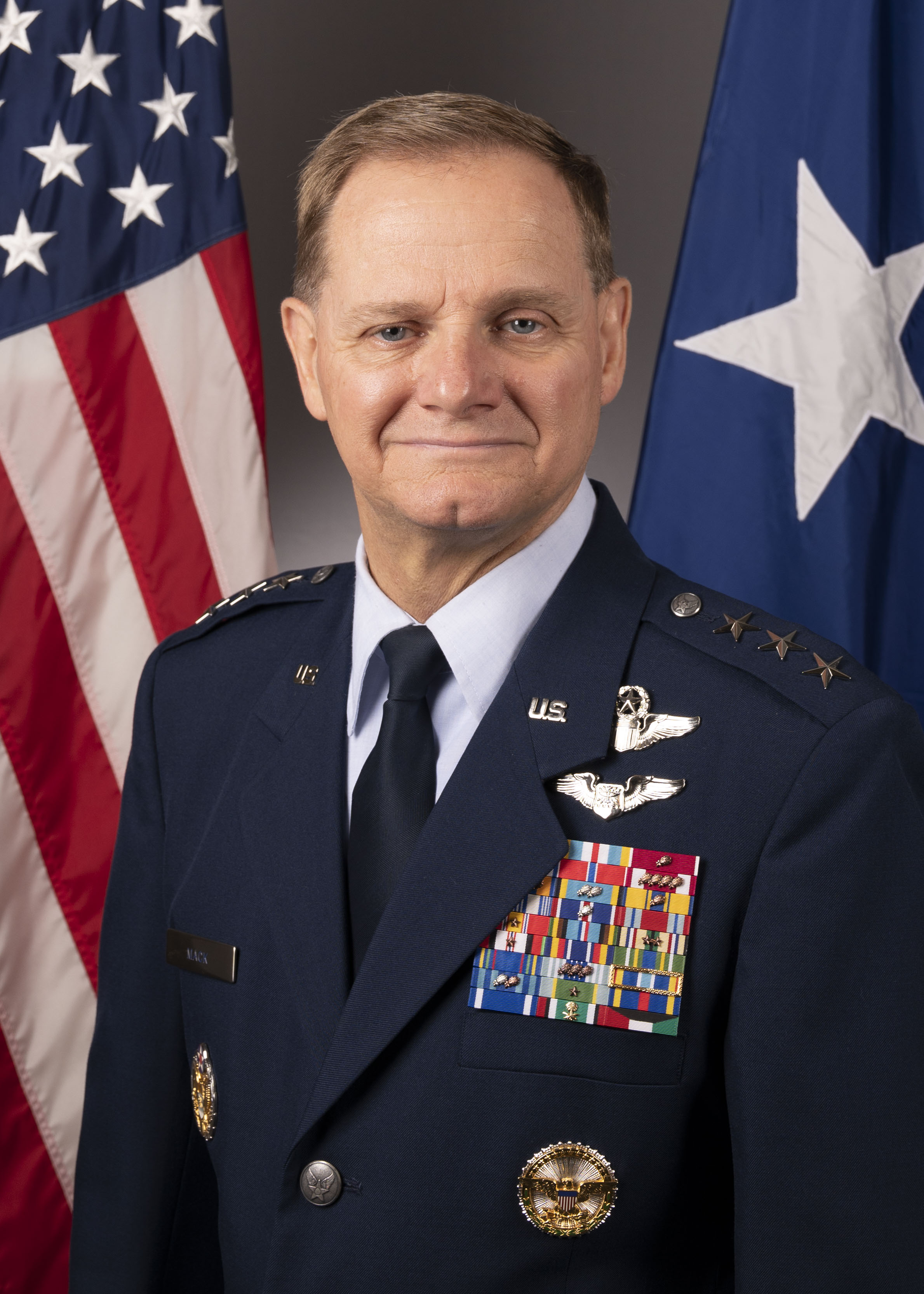
- Military career
- Allegiance: United States
- Branch: United States Air Force
- Service years: 1988–2023
- Rank: Lieutenant General
- Commands: 71st Flying Training Wing; 87th Flying Training Squadron
- Conflicts: Gulf War; War in Afghanistan
- Awards: Air Force Distinguished Service Medal (2); Defense Superior Service Medal; Legion of Merit (2); Distinguished Flying Cross; Bronze Star Medal

Russell L. Mack is a retired United States Air Force lieutenant general who served as the deputy commander of the Air Combat Command from 2021 to 2023. He previously served as the assistant deputy chief of staff for operations of the United States Air Force.

In July 2021, he was nominated for promotion to lieutenant general and assignment as the deputy commander of Air Combat Command.

== Effective dates of promotions ==
Rank	Date
Second Lieutenant	April 13, 1988
First Lieutenant	April 13, 1990
Captain	April 13, 1992
Major	July 1, 1999
Lieutenant Colonel	March 1, 2003
Colonel	September 1, 2007
Brigadier General	September 13, 2013
Major General	July 4, 2017
Lieutenant General	August 16, 2021

Military offices
Preceded by Mark Nowland	Commander of the 71st Flying Training Wing; 2010–2012	Succeeded by Darren V. James
Preceded by Blaine D. Holt	Director of the United States Secretary of the Air Force and Chief of Staff of the United States Air Force Executive Action Group; 2012–2013	Succeeded by Anthony Krawietz
Preceded by John W. Doucette	Inspector General of the Air Combat Command; 2016–2017	Succeeded by Richard A. Coe
Preceded by Jeff Taliaferro	Director of Plans, Programs, and Requirements of the Air Combat Command; 2016–2017	Succeeded by Patrick J. Doherty
Preceded by Mark Dillon	Deputy Commander of the Pacific Air Forces; 2017–2019	Succeeded by Brian Killough
Preceded by Brian S. Robinson	Assistant Deputy Chief of Staff for Operations of the United States Air Force; 2019–2021	Succeeded by Charles Corcoran
Preceded by Christopher Weggeman	Deputy Commander of the Air Combat Command; 2021–2023	Succeeded by Michael Koscheski
