= Derek France =

American general

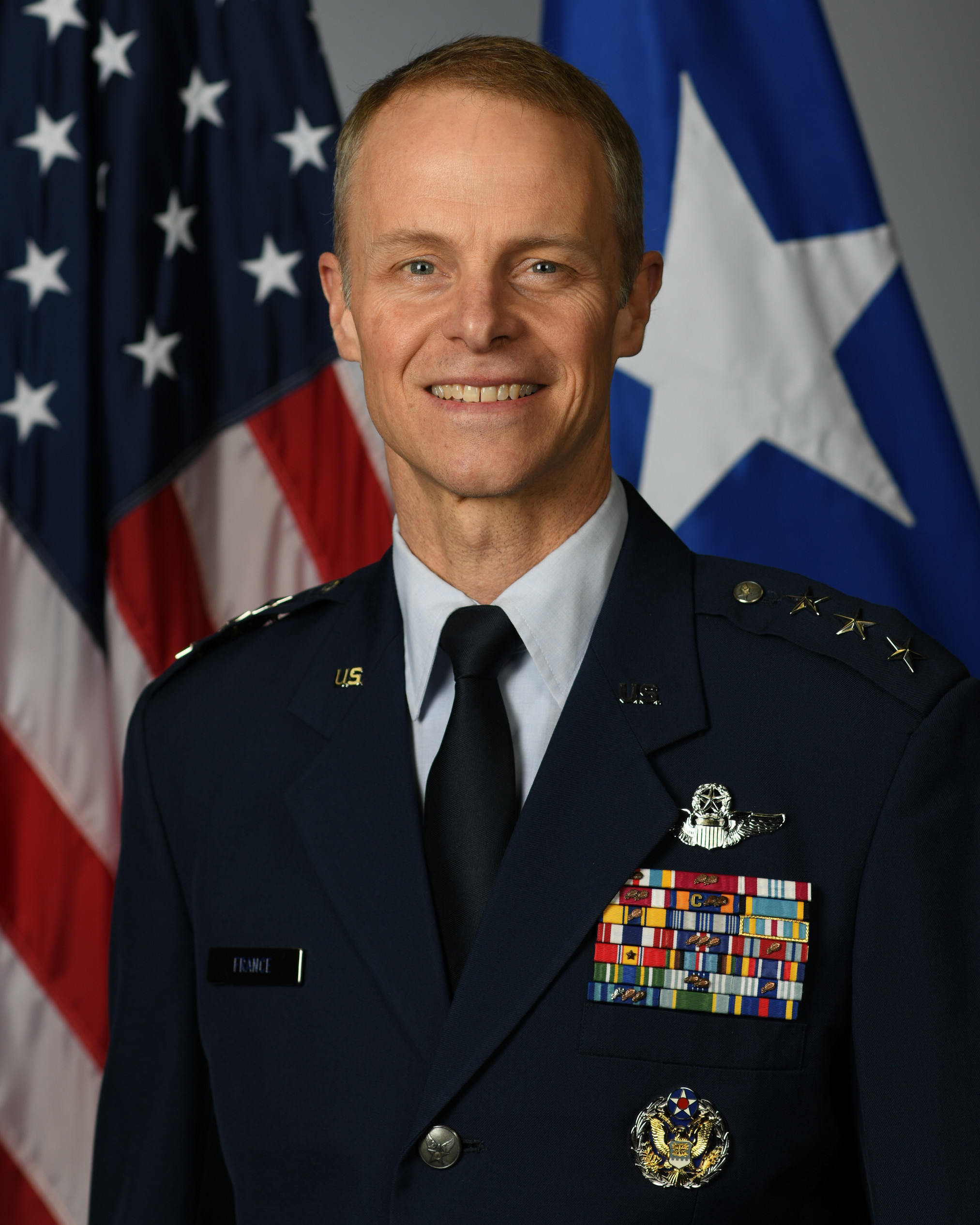
- Official portrait, 2024
- Born: c. 1970 (age 55–56); Las Vegas, Nevada, U.S.
- Education: United States Air Force Academy (BS); United States Naval War College (MS)
- Military career
- Allegiance: United States
- Branch: United States Air Force
- Service years: 1992–2026
- Rank: Lieutenant General
- Commands: United States Air Forces Central Command; Ninth Air Force; Third Air Force; 380th Air Expeditionary Wing; 325th Fighter Wing; 3rd Operations Group; 43rd Fighter Squadron
- Conflicts: 2024 Iran–Israel conflict; War against the Islamic State; Red Sea crisis; Operation Rough Rider; Twelve-Day War; Operation Midnight Hammer; 2026 Iran war
- Awards: Defense Superior Service Medal (2); Legion of Merit (3)

Derek Charles France (born c. 1970) is a retired American lieutenant general who last served as the commander of the Ninth Air Force and Air Forces Central from 2024 to 2026.

France graduated from the United States Air Force Academy in 1992. He achieved the rating of command pilot during his career in the United States Air Force, with over 2,900 flight hours on the F-15, the F-22A, and the F-16C; and served as an instructor pilot at the USAF Weapons School and the Royal Saudi Air Force Fighter Weapons School. His commands included the 43rd Fighter Squadron, 3rd Operations Group, 325th Fighter Wing, and 380th Air Expeditionary Wing. France served as the commander of the Third Air Force in Europe from 2022 to 2024. In that role, he oversaw the Air Force's response to the 2022 Russian invasion of Ukraine.

France's tenure as commander of the Ninth Air Force and Air Forces Central coincided with multiple combat operations in the Middle East. He flew in 30 combat missions during his time in command. He was involved in the Iran–Israel conflict in 2024, the airstrikes against the Houthis in Yemen and the Twelve-Day War in 2025, and the Iran war in 2026. During the latter, France directed the air campaign against Iran from AFCENT's Combined Air Operations Center in South Carolina.

== Early life and education ==
Derek Charles France was born to a military family, with his father serving in the United States Air Force. France was commissioned from the United States Air Force Academy in 1992, where he earned a Bachelor of Science degree in engineering studies.

== Air Force career ==
He underwent pilot training between October 1992 and November 1994 at Laughlin Air Force Base, Texas, and Tyndall Air Force Base, Florida. France then served in the 54th Fighter Squadron at Elmendorf Air Force Base, Alaska, from December 1994 to December 1997 as a pilot, instructor pilot, and flight examiner. From January to June 1998 he underwent training at the USAF Weapons School, before serving as an instructor pilot and the chief of weapons and tactics in the 71st Fighter Squadron at Langley Air Force Base, Virginia, from July 1998 to June 2000. He completed the Squadron Officer School in 1999.

France was an instructor pilot, flight commander, and weapons officer at the F-15C Division of the USAF Weapons School at Nellis Air Force Base, Nevada, from June 2000 to July 2004. He completed the Air Command and Staff College by correspondence in 2003. He was later an instructor pilot at the Royal Saudi Air Force Fighter Weapons School in Dhahran, Saudi Arabia, from August 2004 to June 2005. France was a student at the College of Naval Command and Staff in Newport, Rhode Island, from July 2005 to June 2006, and also earned a Master of Science degree in national security and strategic studies from the Naval War College in 2006. He has the Air Force rating of command pilot with over 2,900 flight hours on the F-15, the F-22A, and the F-16C.

From July 2006 to May 2008, he was the aide-de-camp to the Commander of Air Education and Training Command at Randolph Air Force Base, Texas, before serving as commander of the 43rd Fighter Squadron from June 2008 to June 2010 at Tyndall Air Force Base, Florida. France completed the Air War College by correspondence in 2007, and was a national defense fellow at the U.S. State Department Senior Seminar from July 2010 to July 2011. He later commanded the 3rd Operations Group in Alaska until June 2013. From then until July 2014, France was deputy assistant chief of staff (J3) of United States Forces Korea. France was the commander of the 325th Fighter Wing between July 2014 and July 2016.

France was the Senior Executive Officer to the Vice Chief of Staff of the United States Air Force at The Pentagon from July 2016 to July 2017, Commander of the 380th Air Expeditionary Wing until July 2018 at Al Dhafra Air Base, United Arab Emirates, and deputy director of operations of United States Central Command until June 2020 at MacDill Air Force Base, Florida. France was the director of operations of the Strategic Deterrence and Nuclear Integration for Headquarters U.S. Air Forces in Europe – Air Forces Africa between June 2020 and June 2022. In June 2022, he became commander of the Third Air Force at Ramstein Air Force Base, Germany, a role in which he oversaw the Air Force's regional response to the 2022 Russian invasion of Ukraine.

=== AFCENT commander ===
France in an F-16 during his first flight as the AFCENT commander, July 2024.

In March 2024, France was nominated for promotion to lieutenant general and appointment as commander of the Ninth Air Force. He took office as the commander of the Ninth Air Force and Air Forces Central (AFCENT) from Alexus Grynkewich on 18 April 2024, becoming the Joint Force Air Component Commander of United States Central Command. This occurred days after the April 2024 Iranian strikes on Israel, and France's tenure as AFCENT commander coincided with a period of combat operations.

France was involved in airstrikes in the war against the Islamic State and helped organize the defense of Israel during the 2024 Iran–Israel conflict. In 2025, France presided over combat missions against Yemen's Houthis in Operation Rough Rider, during the Red Sea crisis; and against Iran in Operation Midnight Hammer, during the Twelve-Day War. AFCENT moved its activities from the Combined Air Operations Center at Al Udeid Air Base, Qatar, to a duplicate facility at Shaw Air Force Base, South Carolina, just before the US war against Iran that began on 28 February 2026. During that conflict, France directed the air campaign on Iran from the CAOC in South Carolina. He was also involved in the F-15E rescue operation. France himself flew 30 combat missions during his time as AFCENT commander, including over the Strait of Hormuz.

France relinquished command of the Ninth Air Force and Air Forces Central on 5 August 2026 to Daniel Lasica, and subsequently retired.

== Dates of promotion ==
Rank	Branch	Date
Second lieutenant	Air Force	27 May 1992
First lieutenant	Air Force	27 May 1994
Captain	Air Force	27 May 1996
Major	Air Force	1 November 2002
Lieutenant colonel	Air Force	1 August 2007
Colonel	Air Force	1 September 2011
Brigadier general	Air Force	2 September 2017
Major general	Air Force	4 August 2020
Lieutenant general	Air Force	18 April 2024

Military offices
Preceded by David E. Graff	Commander of the 325th Fighter Wing; 2014–2016	Succeeded by Michael F. Hernandez
Preceded by Chad P. Franks	Senior Executive Officer to the Vice Chief of Staff of the United States Air Force; 2016–2017	Succeeded by Michele C. Edmondson
Preceded by Charles Corcoran	Commander of the 380th Air Expeditionary Wing; 2017–2018	Succeeded by Adrian Spain
Preceded by David Julazadeh	Deputy Director of Operations of the United States Central Command; 2018–2020	Succeeded by David C. Foley
Preceded by Michael Koscheski	Director of Operations, Strategic Deterrence, and Nuclear Integration of the United States Air Forces in Europe – Air Forces Africa; 2020–2022	Succeeded by Joel Carey
Preceded by Randall Reed	Commander of the Third Air Force; 2022–2024	Succeeded by Paul Moga
Preceded by Alexus Grynkewich	Commander of the Ninth Air Force; 2024–2026	Succeeded by Daniel Lasica
