= Adrian Spain =

U.S. Air Force general

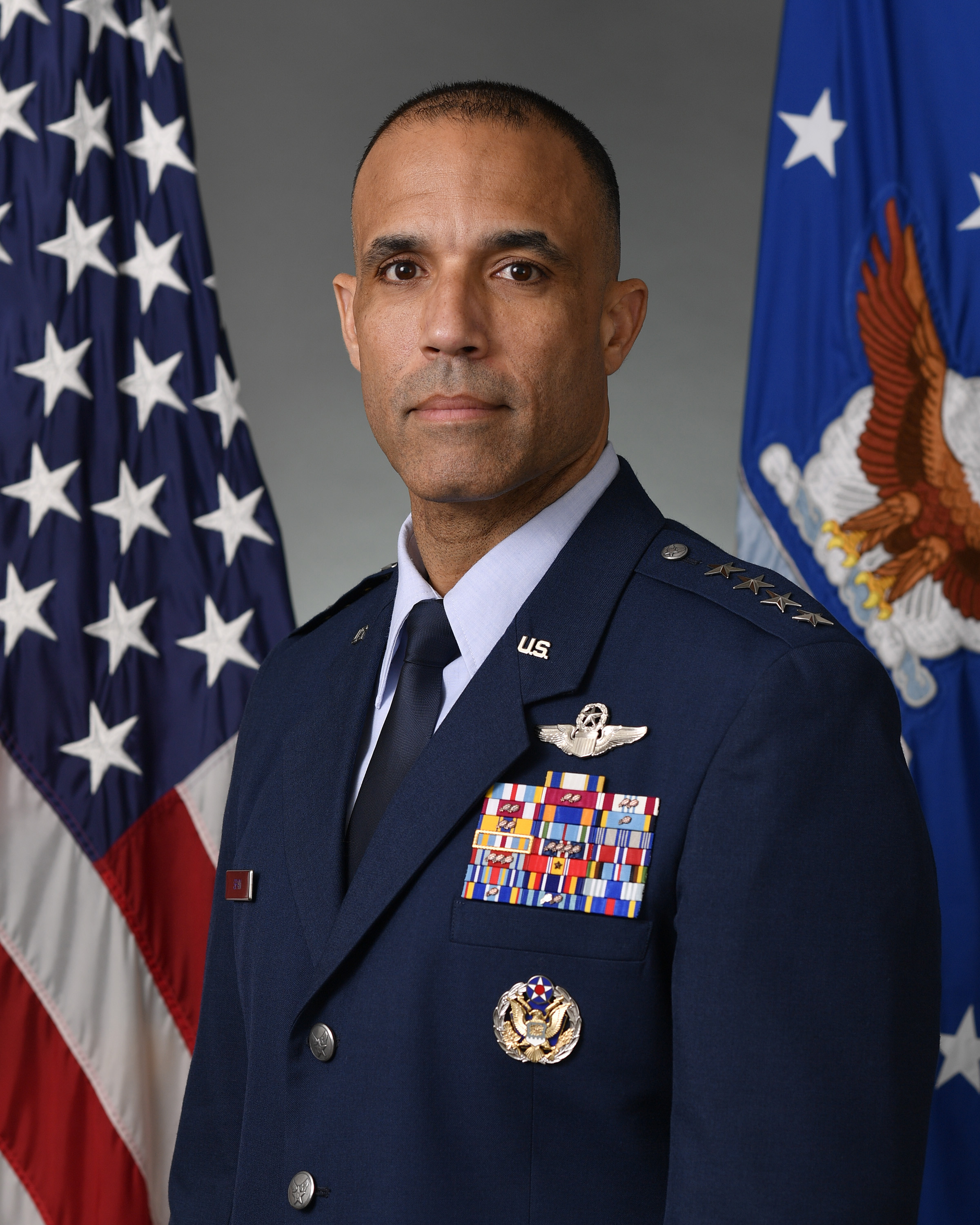
- Official portrait, 2025
- Military career
- Allegiance: United States
- Branch: United States Air Force
- Service years: 1994–present
- Rank: General
- Commands: Air Combat Command; 380th Air Expeditionary Wing; 53rd Wing; USAF Weapons School; 94th Fighter Squadron
- Awards: Air Force Distinguished Service Medal; Defense Superior Service Medal; Legion of Merit (3)

Adrian L. Spain is a United States Air Force general who has served as the Commander of the Air Combat Command since August 2025. He previously served as deputy chief of staff for operations of the United States Air Force, and before that as the director of training and readiness of Air Force.

In September 2023, Spain was nominated for promotion to lieutenant general. In June 2025, Spain was nominated for promotion to general.

== Awards and decorations ==

USAF Command Pilot wings
U.S Air Force Distinguished Service Medal
Defense Superior Service Medal with two bronze oak leaf clusters	Legion of Merit with two bronze oak leaf clusters	Defense Meritorious Service Medal with two bronze oak leaf clusters
Meritorious Service Medal with two bronze oak leaf clusters	Air Medal	Aerial Achievement Medal with bronze oak leaf cluster
Air and Space Commendation Medal with two bronze oak leaf clusters	Joint Service Achievement Medal	Air Force Achievement Medal
Joint Meritorious Unit Award	Air Force Meritorious Unit with four bronze oak leaf clusters	Air and Space Organizational Excellence Award
Combat Readiness Medal with three bronze oak leaf clusters	National Defense Service Medal with bronze service star	Armed Forces Expeditionary Medal
Global War on Terrorism Expeditionary Medal	Global War on Terrorism Service Medal	Air and Space Overseas Long Tour Service Ribbon
Air and Space Expeditionary Service Ribbon with bronze oak leaf cluster	Air and Space Longevity Service Award w/ 1 silver oak leaf cluster and 1 bronze oak leaf cluster	Air Force Training Ribbon
Headquarters Air Force Badge

Military offices
Preceded by Robert Garland	Commandant of the USAF Weapons School; 2013–2015	Succeeded by Michael R. Drowley
Preceded by Alexus Grynkewich	Commander of the 53rd Wing; 2015–2017	Succeeded by David W. Abba
Preceded by Richard H. Boutwell	Executive Officer to the Commander of the North American Aerospace Defense Command and United States Northern Command; 2017–2018	Succeeded by ???
Preceded by Derek France	Commander of the 380th Air Expeditionary Wing; 2018–2019	Succeeded by Lansing Pilch
Preceded by Michael Koscheski	Director of Plans, Programs, and Analyses of the United States Air Forces in Europe – Air Forces Africa; 2019–2021	Succeeded by Jason T. Hinds
Preceded by Lance Landrum	Director of Operations of the United States European Command; 2021–2022	Succeeded by Peter B. Andrysiak
Preceded by John Lamontagne	Chief of Staff of the United States European Command; 2022–2023	Succeeded by Peter B. Andrysiak
Preceded by Albert G. Miller	Director of Training and Readiness of the United States Air Force; 2023	Succeeded by Travolis A. Simmons
Preceded by James C. Slife	Deputy Chief of Staff for Operations of the United States Air Force; 2023–2025	Succeeded by Case A. Cunningham
Preceded by Kenneth S. Wilsbach	Commander of the Air Combat Command; 2025-present	Incumbent
