= Clark Quinn =

US Air Force general

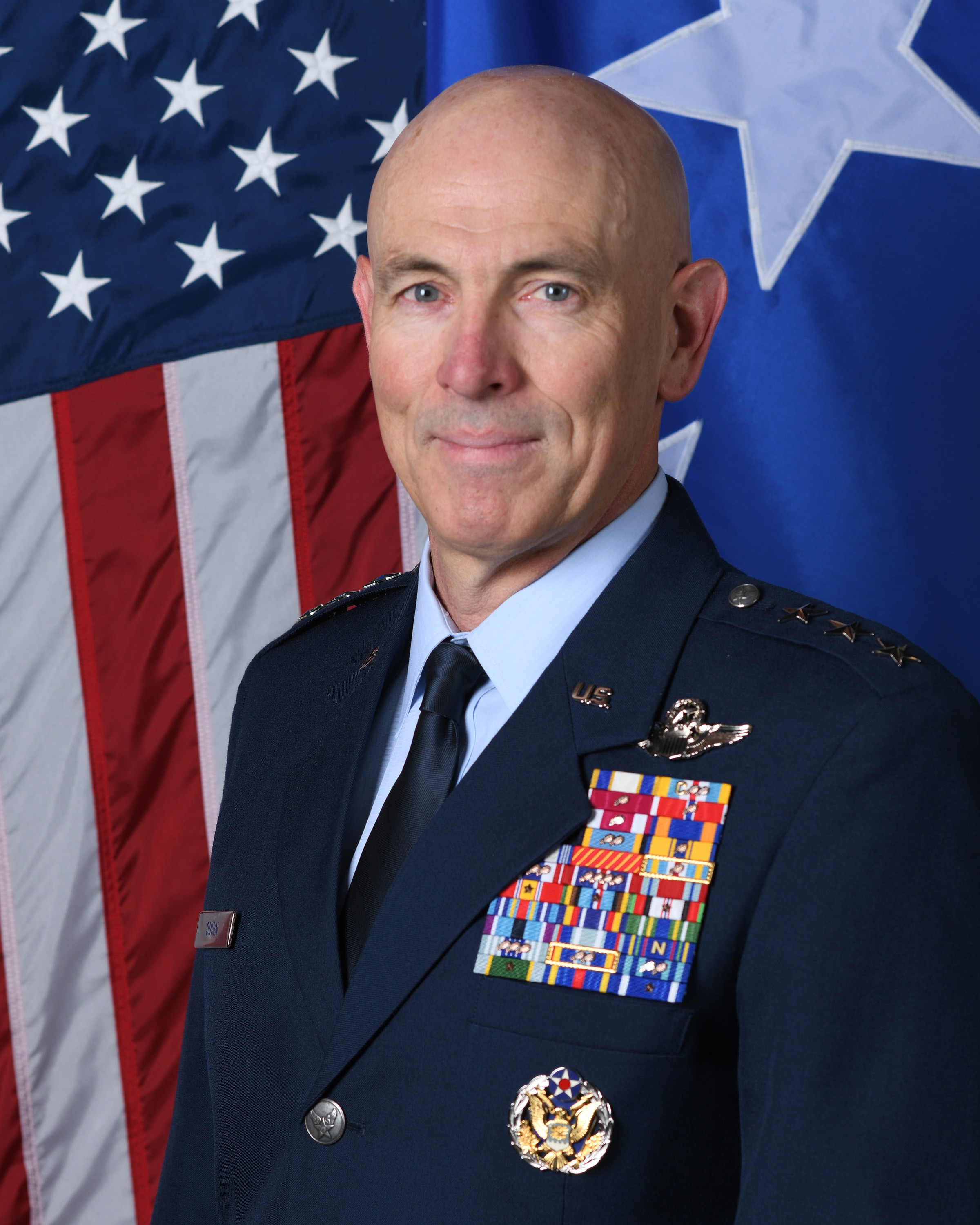
- Military career
- Allegiance: United States
- Branch: United States Air Force
- Service years: 1993–present
- Rank: Lieutenant General
- Commands: Air Education and Training Command; Nineteenth Air Force; 71st Flying Training Wing; 20th Operations Support Squadron
- Awards: Defense Superior Service Medal (2); Legion of Merit

Clark J. Quinn is a United States Air Force Lieutenant General who has served as the commander of Air Education and Training Command since October 2025. Prior to this role, he was the Deputy Commander of Air Education and Training Command. He also served as the commander of Nineteenth Air Force and as the deputy commander of the Ninth Air Force.

In February 2021, Quinn was nominated and confirmed for promotion to major general, which became effective July 6, 2021.

His promotion to lieutenant general occurred on Oct. 31, 2025 at Randolph Air Force Base, Texas.

Military offices
| Preceded by Darren V. James | Commander of the 71st Flying Training Wing; 2014–2016 | Succeeded by Darrell F. Judy |
| Preceded by Michael Koscheski | Chief of Strategic Planning Integration of the United States Air Force; 2017–2018 | Succeeded by Roy W. Collins |
| Preceded by Lance R. Bunch | Vice Commander of the 9th Air and Space Expeditionary Task Force - Afghanistan; 2018–2019 | Succeeded by John C. Walker |
| Preceded by Joseph D. McFall | Deputy Commander of the Ninth Air Force; 2021–2023 | Succeeded by David A. Mineau |
| Preceded by Christopher R. Amrhein; Acting | Commander of the Nineteenth Air Force; 2023–2024 | Succeeded by Gregory Kreuder |
| Preceded by James R. Sears | Deputy Commander of the Air Education and Training Command; 2024–present | Incumbent |
