= General Robinson =

General Robinson may refer to:

- Alfred Robinson (British Army officer) (1894–1978), British Army major general
- Brian S. Robinson, U.S. Air Force lieutenant general and deputy commander of the Air Mobility Command
- David Robinson (1754–1842), Vermont soldier active in the American Revolution
- David A. Robinson (born 1954), U.S. Air Force major general
- Fred D. Robinson Jr. (fl. 1970s–2000s), U.S. Army major general
- Frederick Philipse Robinson (1763–1852), British soldier in the American Revolutionary War and the War of 1812
- James S. Robinson (1827–1892), U.S. Representative from Ohio and Union Army general in the American Civil War
- John C. Robinson (1817–1897), Union Army general in the American Civil War
- Lori Robinson (c. 1959–), U.S. Air Force general and commander of USNORTHCOM and NORAD
- Ray A. Robinson (1896–1976), U.S. Marine Corps officer active in World Wars I and II
- Roscoe Robinson Jr. (1928–1993), first African-American four-star general in the U.S. Army
- Wallace H. Robinson (1920–2013), U.S. Marine Corps general and quartermaster general
- William Robinson Jr. (1785–1868), Pennsylvania politician, businessman and militia general

== See also ==
- Henry Robinson-Montagu, 6th Baron Rokeby (1798–1883), British Army general
- Attorney General Robinson (disambiguation)
