= Charles Q. Brown Jr. =

US Air Force general (born 1962)

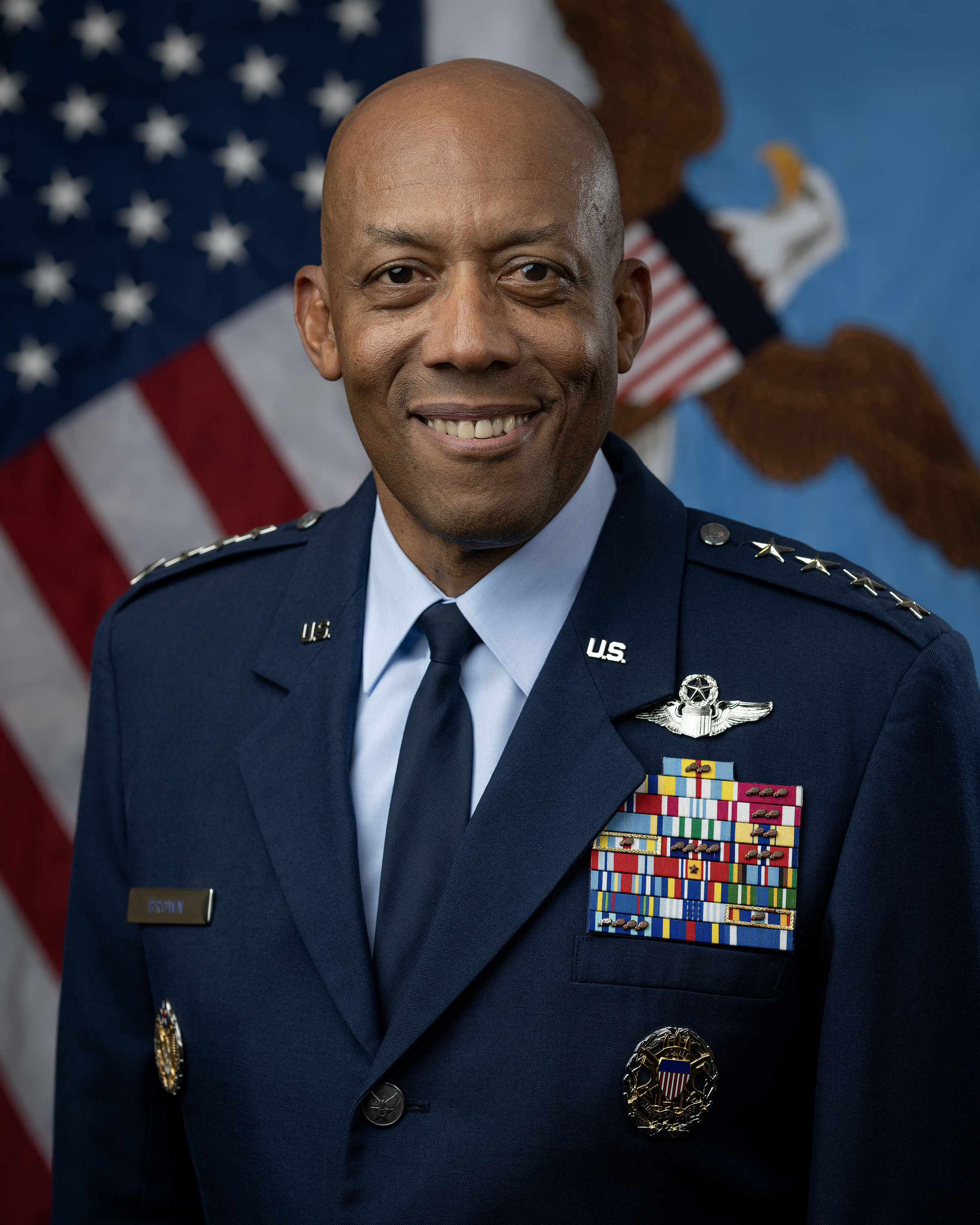
- Official portrait, 2023
- Born: Charles Quinton Brown Jr. 2 March 1962 (age 64); San Antonio, Texas, U.S.
- Education: Texas Tech University (BS); Embry-Riddle Aeronautical University, Daytona Beach (MS)
- Military career
- Allegiance: United States
- Branch: United States Air Force
- Service years: 1984–2025
- Rank: General
- Nickname: CQ
- Commands: Chairman of the Joint Chiefs of Staff; Chief of Staff of the Air Force; Pacific Air Forces; United States Air Forces Central Command; 31st Fighter Wing; 8th Fighter Wing; USAF Weapons School; 78th Fighter Squadron
- Conflicts: Operation Southern Watch; Operation Northern Watch; Operation Enduring Freedom; Operation Odyssey Dawn; Operation Unified Protector; Operation Inherent Resolve
- Awards: Defense Distinguished Service Medal (3); Air Force Distinguished Service Medal; Defense Superior Service Medal; Legion of Merit (4)
- Brown's voice Brown's opening statement at his confirmation hearing to be chairman of the Joint Chiefs of Staff; Recorded 11 July 2023

Signature
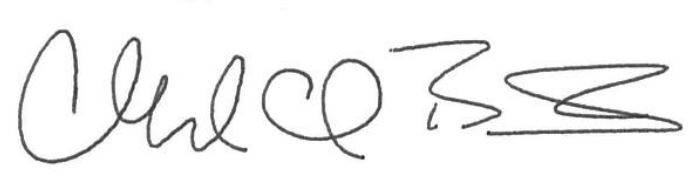

Charles Quinton Brown Jr. (born 2 March 1962) is a retired United States Air Force general who served as the 21st chairman of the Joint Chiefs of Staff from 2023 to 2025. Prior to that appointment, Brown served as the 22nd chief of staff of the Air Force from 2020 to 2023.

Brown entered the Air Force in 1984, through the Reserve Officer Training Corps and served as a fighter pilot, where he has logged over 3,000 flight hours, including 130 hours in combat. He has commanded the Pacific Air Forces, U.S. Air Forces Central Command, 31st Fighter Wing, 8th Fighter Wing, U.S. Air Force Weapons School, and 78th Fighter Squadron. He has also served as deputy commander of the U.S. Central Command.

Brown, nominated by President Donald Trump during his first term, became the first African American to lead a branch of the United States Armed Forces. He was later nominated by President Joe Biden to become Chairman of the Joint Chiefs of Staff. Brown was abruptly dismissed as Chairman of the Joint Chiefs of Staff on 21 February 2025, by President Donald Trump. Trump subsequently announced that Brown would be replaced with Dan Caine.

In 2020, Brown was on Time's list of the 100 most influential people in the world.

== Early life and education ==
Charles Quinton Brown Jr. was born in 1962, to a military family, in San Antonio, Texas. Brown was nicknamed "CQ". He has one younger sister. He had one younger brother (died in 2003). His father, Charles Sr., served for 30 years in the Army, rising to the rank of colonel. His paternal grandfather, Robert E. Brown, was drafted in World War II and served in the Pacific Theater in Hawaii and Saipan.

Brown graduated in 1980, from Homer L. Ferguson High School in Newport News, Virginia and from Texas Tech University in Lubbock with a Bachelor of Science degree in civil engineering. He was also a distinguished graduate of the Air Force Reserve Officers Training Corps. At Texas Tech, he joined the Eta Upsilon chapter of Alpha Phi Alpha fraternity in the spring of 1981.

In 1994, while serving in the Air Force, Brown earned a master's degree in aeronautical science from Embry-Riddle Aeronautical University, in Daytona Beach, Florida.

== Military career ==
Brown was commissioned as a second lieutenant in 1984 through the Air Force Reserve Officer Training Corps at Texas Tech University. From May 1985 to March 1987, he underwent pilot training in Arizona, New Mexico, and Florida, and was promoted to first lieutenant on 28 February 1987. In April 1987, Brown became an F-16 pilot with the 35th Fighter Squadron at Kunsan Air Base, South Korea, until October 1988. In the following month he was made an instructor pilot and wing electronic combat officer for the 307th and 308th Fighter Squadrons, at the Homestead Air Force Base, Florida. On 28 February 1989 he was promoted to captain. From April to August 1991 he was a student at the USAF Fighter Weapons School, at Nellis Air Force Base, Nevada, graduating from its Instructor Course. After that he was a squadron weapons officer for the 307th Squadron until August 1992. In 1992, he also completed the Squadron Officer School.

From September 1992 to October 1994, Brown was an instructor and evaluator in the F-16 Division at the USAF Weapons School, and after that he was the aide-de-camp to the chief of staff of the Air Force in Arlington, Virginia, until July 1996. On 1 August 1996, he was promoted to major, and also starting that month he became a student at the Air Command and Staff College at Maxwell Air Force Base, Alabama. Brown completed the college as a distinguished graduate in June 1997. He then became a student at the Armed Forces Staff College in Norfolk, Virginia, graduating in September 1997. Later that month he was made an air operations officer for the U.S. Central Command, at MacDill Air Force Base, Florida. Brown was promoted to lieutenant colonel on 1 July 1999, and he remained in his role as an air operations officer until November 1999. Between then and June 2003, he had several assignments with multiple squadrons, with the final one being as commander of the 78th Fighter Squadron at Shaw Air Force Base, South Carolina. Brown also completed the Air War College in 2000.

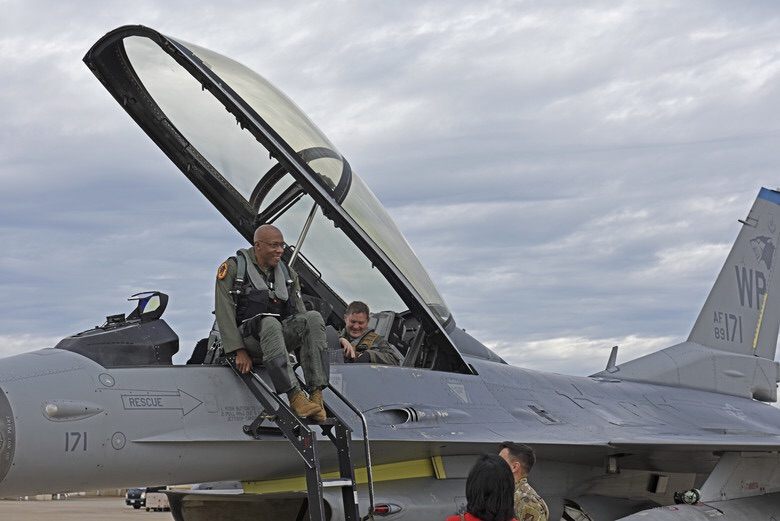
Lieutenant General Brown with an F-16 Fighting Falcon

He was a national defense fellow at the Institute for Defense Analyses, Alexandria, Virginia, from July 2003 to June 2004, and then was the deputy chief of the program integration division at Headquarters Air Force, until June 2005. That same month, on 1 June, Brown was promoted to colonel, and in July 2005, he became the commandant of the U.S. Air Force Weapons School. After that he commanded the 8th Fighter Wing in South Korea from May 2007 to May 2008, and then led the Executive Action Group at Headquarters Air Force from June 2008 to May 2009. He is a command pilot with more than 3,100 flying hours, including 130 combat hours.

Brown's career as a general officer began when he was appointed as commander of the 31st Fighter Wing in Aviano Air Base, Italy in June 2009, and was promoted to the rank of brigadier general on 20 November 2009. He was deputy director for operations of U.S. Central Command at MacDill Air Force Base from May 2011 to March 2013. In May 2013, Brown was promoted to the rank of major general when he was appointed as deputy commander, U.S. Air Forces Central Command, U.S. Central Command. In March 2014, he was appointed as director of operations, strategic deterrence, and nuclear integration of U.S. Air Forces in Europe – Air Forces Africa at Ramstein Air Base, Germany. In June 2015, Brown received his third star when he was appointed as commander of United States Air Forces Central Command (USAFCENT) and promoted to lieutenant general. In July 2016, he was appointed as deputy commander of United States Central Command. As AFCENT commander, Brown oversaw all of Air Force operations in the Middle East and Central Asia, while also second-in-command of USCENTCOM.

In July 2018, Brown was nominated to succeed General Terrence J. O'Shaughnessy as commander of Pacific Air Forces. O'Shaughnessy was nominated to become commander of the United States Northern Command. Brown was also promoted to four-star general with this position. As PACAF commander, Brown oversaw all of major United States Air Force operations within the Indo-Pacific region.

=== Chief of Staff of the Air Force ===
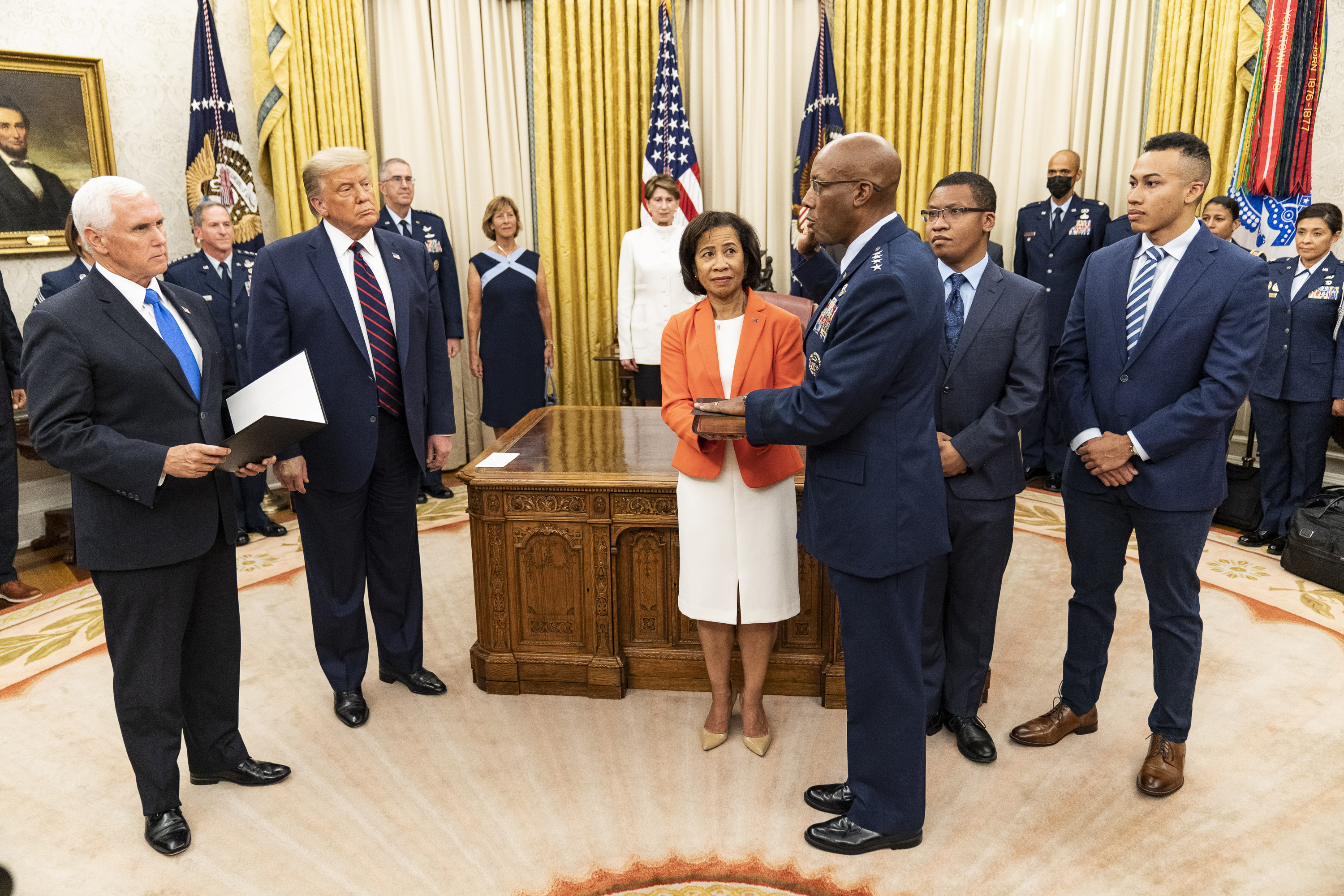
Vice President Mike Pence ceremonially swears in Brown as the 22nd chief of staff of the United States Air Force in the Oval Office, 4 August 2020. Brown officially took office two days later in a separate ceremony at Joint Base Andrews

On 2 March 2020, the White House announced that President Donald Trump would nominate Brown to become the next Chief of Staff of the United States Air Force, succeeding General David L. Goldfein. On 9 June 2020, Brown was unanimously confirmed (98–0) by the United States Senate to succeed Goldfein as Chief of Staff of the US Air Force. With this confirmation he became the first African American to lead a branch of the United States Armed Forces. As Air Force Chief of Staff, he advises the President, Secretary of Defense, and National Security Council regarding Air Force matters, and is the most senior uniformed Air Force officer responsible for organizing, training and equipping all of the active-duty Air Force officers, Air National Guard and Air Force Reserve.

Brown acted to establish a flexible logistics system in the Air Force's budget for Fiscal year 2021, to ensure the Air Force is capable of conducting "expeditionary logistics under attack". He maintained Goldfein's prioritization of multi-domain command and control after the Air Force Association's 2016 Air, Space & Cyber Conference. After the establishment of the United States Space Force, which is also part of the Department of the Air Force, Brown worked closely with the first Chief of Space Operations General Jay Raymond. Brown has said that the Space Force will make up much of the Air Force department's "near-term innovation and development". He has emphasized the importance of space superiority and committed to a full collaboration between the Air Force and Space Force.

As Air Force Chief of Staff, Brown began integration of the new tanker aircraft, Boeing KC-46 Pegasus, as part of Air Force fleet rejuvenation, and began its operation within Air Mobility Command. Brown and several Congressional delegation members, including U.S. Senator Jeanne Shaheen, a longtime advocate for the tanker, participated in a demonstration flight at Joint Base Andrews.

Brown was featured during the 2021 African-American History Month for making history as the first African-American military chief of staff and the first African American who has led any military branch within the United States Armed Forces. General Lloyd Austin, the first African American to serve as a United States Secretary of Defense, was also featured. Brown was made an honorary Tuskegee Airman, receiving the symbolic red jacket in a ceremony on 14 August 2021.

=== Chairman of the Joint Chiefs of Staff ===
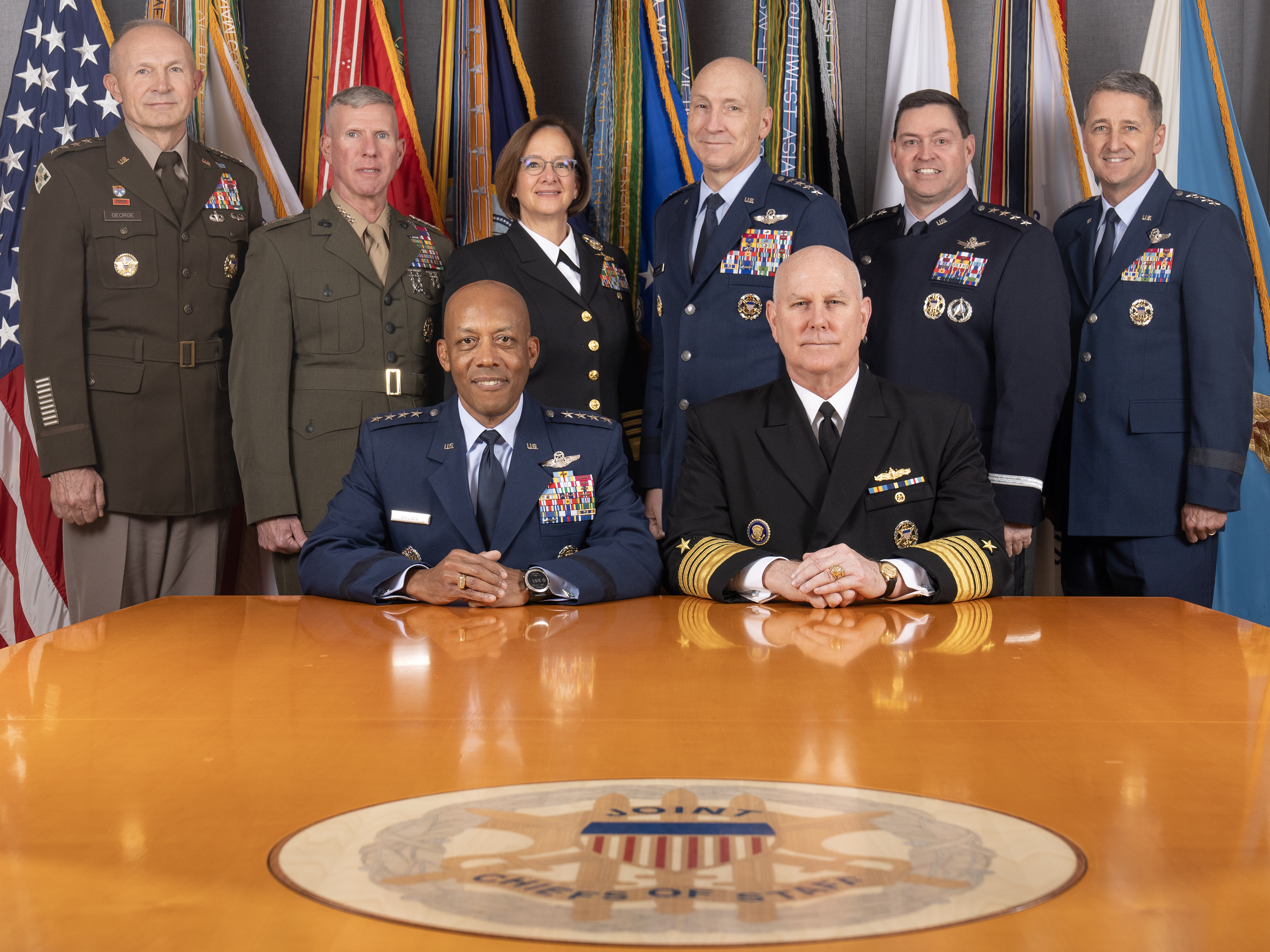
Brown (sitting, left) with the other members of the Joint Chiefs of Staff on 14 November 2024

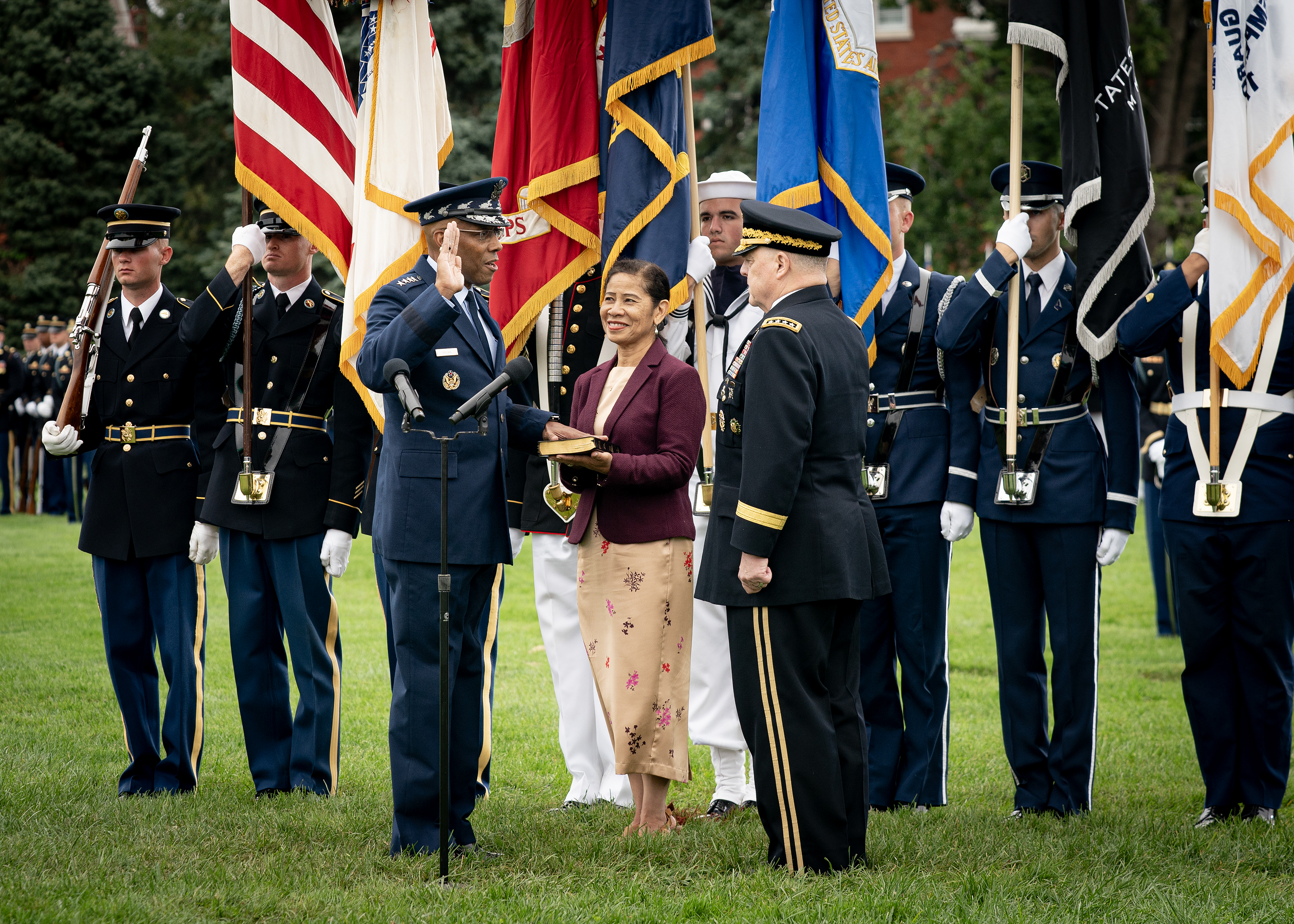
Brown is sworn in as chairman of the Joint Chiefs of Staff by his predecessor, General Mark Milley, on 29 September 2023

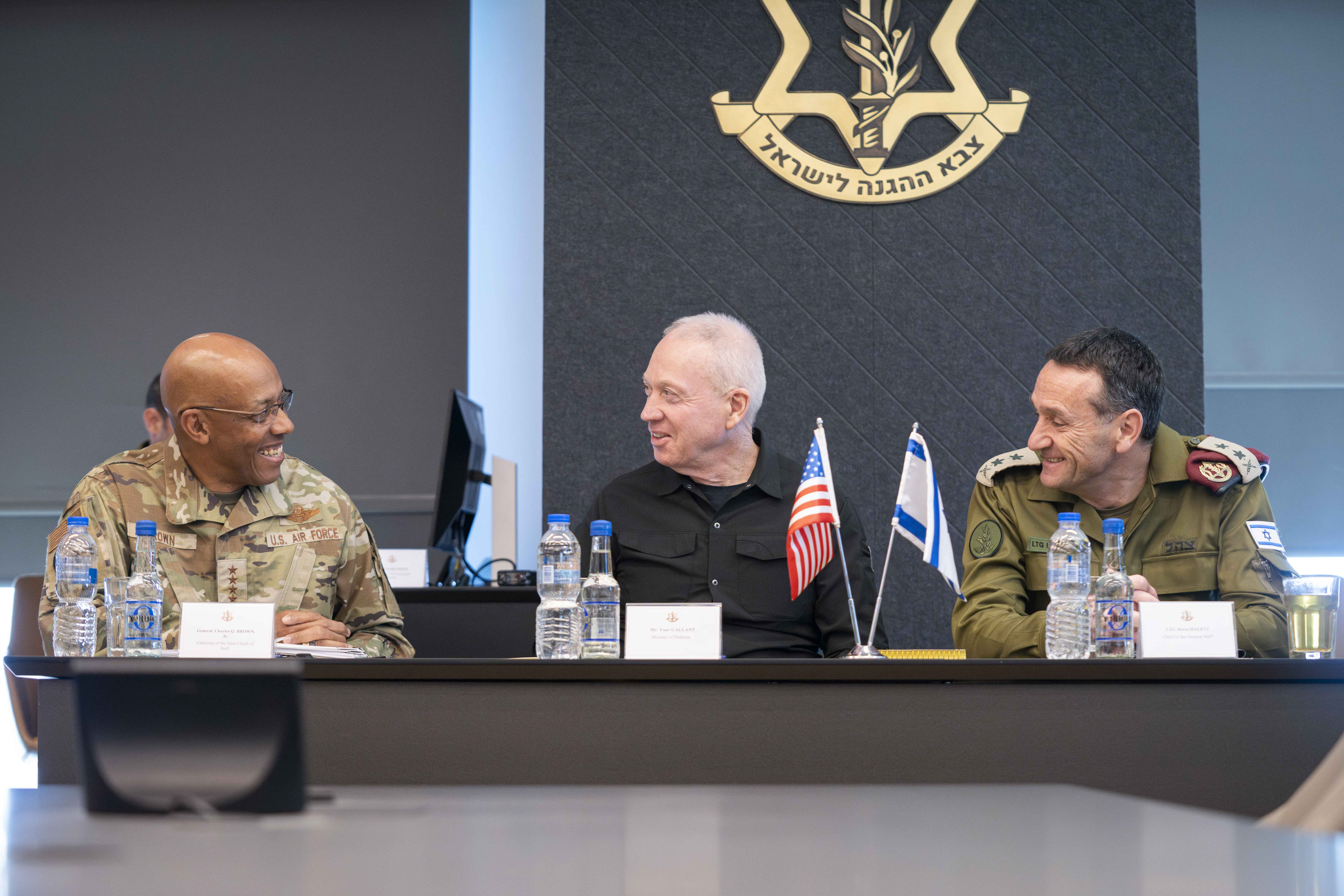
Brown with Israeli Defense Minister Yoav Gallant and Israeli Chief of General Staff Herzi Halevi in Israel, 26 August 2024

Considered a frontrunner for the position prior to his official nomination, Brown was formally announced as President Joe Biden's nominee to succeed General Mark Milley as the 21st chairman of the Joint Chiefs of Staff on 25 May 2023. He was confirmed by the Senate on 20 September 2023, and sworn in on 29 September. His term was effective as of 1 October 2023.

After the outbreak of the Gaza war, Brown said that the U.S. military can support the needs of both Israel and Ukraine. He warned Iran "not to get involved" in the war in Gaza. In August 2024, Brown traveled to Jordan with plans to also visit Egypt and Israel. In August 2024, Brown visited Israel and met with Israeli Defense Minister Yoav Gallant and Israeli Chief of General Staff Herzi Halevi to discuss threats from Iran.

On 21 February 2025, President Trump dismissed Brown from the position of chairman. Pete Hegseth, who was later appointed United States Secretary of Defense by Trump, had previously called for Brown's dismissal because of his involvement in promoting diversity, equity and inclusion (DEI), and questioned whether Brown had gotten the job solely because of his race. Trump said that he would nominate Dan Caine as Brown's successor. As of April 2025, Brown retired from the Air Force after over 41 years of service.

== Education ==
- 1984 Bachelor of Science degree in civil engineering, Texas Tech University, Lubbock
- 1991 U.S. Air Force Fighter Weapons School, Nellis Air Force Base, Nevada
- 1992 Squadron Officer School, Maxwell AFB, Alabama
- 1994 Master of Aeronautical Science degree, Embry-Riddle Aeronautical University, Daytona Beach, Florida
- 1997 Distinguished graduate, Air Command and Staff College, Maxwell AFB, Alabama
- 2000 Air War College, Maxwell AFB, Alabama
- 2004 National Defense Fellow, Institute for Defense Analyses, Alexandria, Virginia
- 2008 AF Senior Leadership Course, Center for Creative Leadership, Greensboro, North Carolina
- 2012 Joint Force Air Component Commander Course, Maxwell AFB, Alabama
- 2014 Joint Flag Officer Warfighting Course, Maxwell AFB, Alabama
- 2015 Pinnacle Course, National Defense University, Fort Lesley J. McNair, Washington, D.C.
- 2017 Leadership at the Peak, Center for Creative Leadership, Colorado Springs, Colorado

== Flight information ==
Brown is rated as a command pilot, having logged more than 3,100 flight hours, including 130 combat hours. Aircraft he has flown include the F-16A/B/C/D, AC-130U, AH-64, AT-38, B-1B, B-2A, B-52H, C-130J, E-8C, HH-60G, KC-135, MV-22, T-37, T-38 and two more fixed-wing or rotary-wing aircraft.

== Civilian career ==
Shortly after retiring from the Air Force, Brown joined Duke University in July 2025 as an executive in residence for both the Sanford School of Public Policy and Pratt School of Engineering. In February 2026, Brown joined the National Security Advisory Board of Shield Capital, a venture capital firm focused on technologies supporting national security and commercial markets.

== Awards and decorations ==
Brown has received the following awards and decorations:

Personal decorations
	Defense Distinguished Service Medal with two bronze oak leaf clusters
	Air Force Distinguished Service Medal
	Defense Superior Service Medal
Width-44 crimson ribbon with a pair of width-2 white stripes on the edges	Legion of Merit with three oak leaf clusters
	Bronze Star Medal
	Defense Meritorious Service Medal
	Meritorious Service Medal with two oak leaf clusters
	Aerial Achievement Medal
	Joint Service Commendation Medal
	Air Force Commendation Medal with two oak leaf clusters
Unit awards
	Joint Meritorious Unit Award with oak leaf cluster
	Air Force Outstanding Unit Award with four oak leaf clusters
	Air Force Organizational Excellence Award with two oak leaf clusters
Service awards
	Combat Readiness Medal
Campaign and service medals
	National Defense Service Medal with one bronze service star
	Armed Forces Expeditionary Medal
	Global War on Terrorism Expeditionary Medal
	Global War on Terrorism Service Medal
	Korea Defense Service Medal
Service, training, and marksmanship awards
	Nuclear Deterrence Operations Service Medal
	Air Force Overseas Short Tour Service Ribbon
	Air Force Expeditionary Service Ribbon with gold frame and oak leaf cluster
	Air Force Longevity Service Award with one silver and three bronze oak leaf clusters
	Air Force Training Ribbon
Foreign awards
	Order of National Security Merit Sam-Il Medal (Republic of Korea)
	Pingat Jasa Gemilang (Tentera) (Singapore)
	Commander of the Legion of Honour (France)
	NATO Medal for Former Yugoslavia

Other accoutrements
US Air Force Command Pilot Badge
Philippine Air Force Gold Wings Badge (May 2019)
Office of the Joint Chiefs of Staff Identification Badge
Headquarters Air Force Badge

=== Other recognition ===
- In 2022, Brown received the Golden Plate Award of the American Academy of Achievement.

== Effective dates of promotion ==
Insignia	Rank	Date
	General	26 July 2018
	Lieutenant general	29 June 2015
	Major general	3 July 2013
	Brigadier general	20 November 2009
	Colonel	1 June 2005
	Lieutenant colonel	1 July 1999
	Major	1 August 1996
	Captain	28 February 1989
	First lieutenant	28 February 1987
	Second lieutenant	28 February 1985

Military offices
Preceded by Craig A. Franklin	Commander of the 31st Fighter Wing; 2009–2011	Succeeded by Scott Zobrist
Preceded by John Hesterman	Commander of United States Air Forces Central Command; 2015–2016	Succeeded by Jeffrey L. Harrigian
Preceded by Terrence J. O'Shaughnessy	Commander of the Pacific Air Forces; 2018–2020	Succeeded by Kenneth S. Wilsbach
Preceded by David L. Goldfein	Chief of Staff of the United States Air Force; 2020–2023	Succeeded by David W. Allvin
Preceded by Mark Milley	Chairman of the Joint Chiefs of Staff; 2023–2025	Succeeded by Christopher W. Grady; Acting
U.S. order of precedence (ceremonial)
Preceded by Mark Milley as former Chair of the Joint Chiefs of Staff	Order of precedence of the United States as former Chair of the Joint Chiefs of Staff	Succeeded by Christopher J. Mahoney as Vice Chairman of the Joint Chiefs of Staff
