= Attorney General Robinson =

Attorney General Robinson may refer to:

- Arthur Robinson (Australian politician) (1872–1945), Attorney-General of Victoria
- Bryan Robinson (judge) (1808–1887), Attorney-General of Newfoundland Colony
- Christopher Robinson (Rhode Island politician) (1806–1889), Attorney General of Rhode Island
- Sir John Robinson, 1st Baronet, of Toronto (1791–1863), Attorney General for Upper Canada
- Robert Thomson Robinson (1867–1926), Attorney-General of Western Australia

== See also ==
- General Robinson (disambiguation)
