= Terrence J. O'Shaughnessy =

United States Air Force general

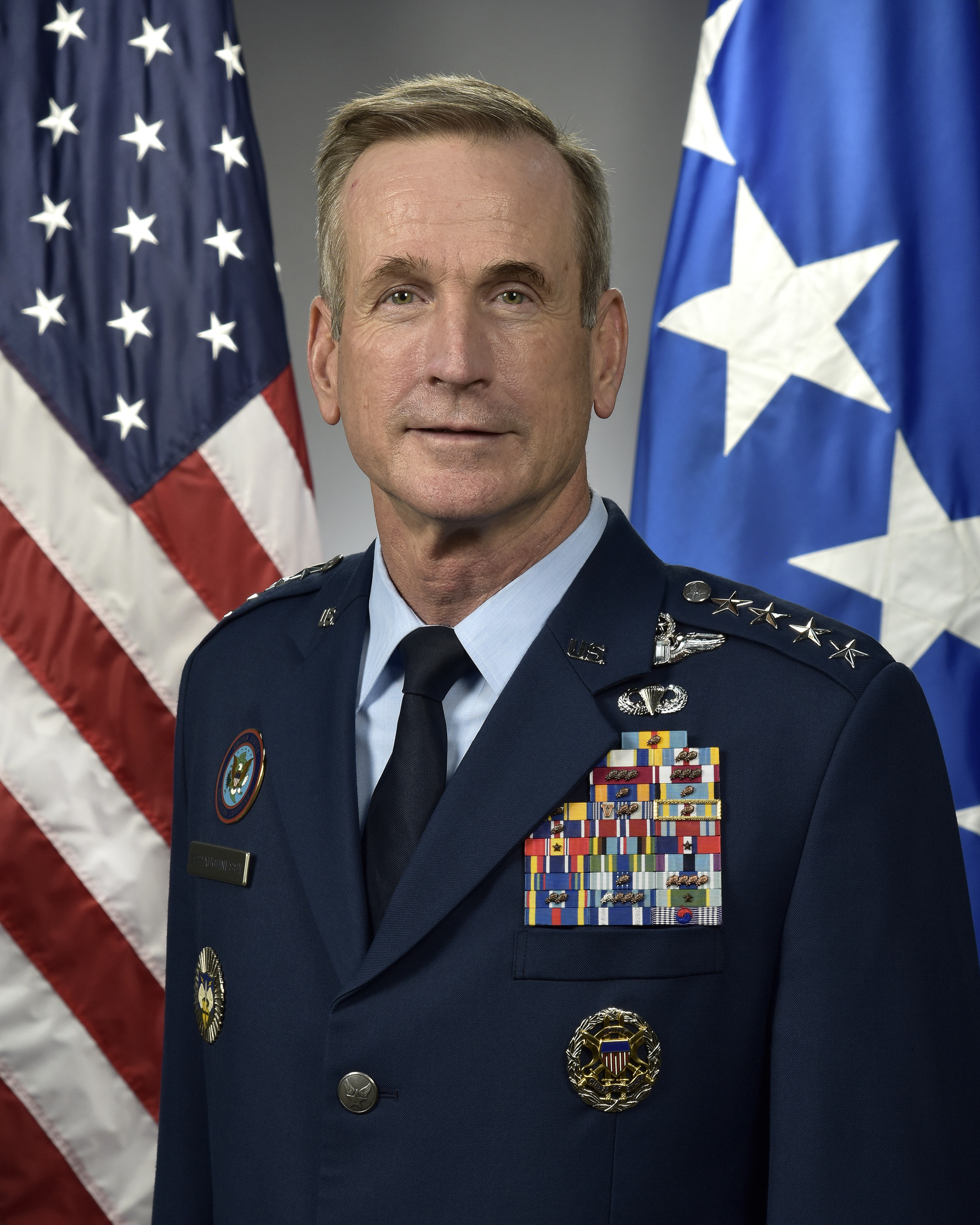
- Born: 1964 or 1965 (age 61–62); North Bay, Ontario, Canada
- Military career
- Allegiance: United States
- Branch: United States Air Force
- Service years: 1986–2020
- Rank: General
- Commands: United States Northern Command; North American Aerospace Defense Command; Pacific Air Forces; Seventh Air Force; 57th Wing; 613th Air and Space Operations Center; 35th Fighter Wing; 57th Adversary Tactics Group; 510th Fighter Squadron
- Conflicts: War in Afghanistan
- Awards: Defense Distinguished Service Medal (2); Air Force Distinguished Service Medal; Defense Superior Service Medal (3); Legion of Merit (4)

Terrence John O'Shaughnessy (born c. 1964) is a retired United States Air Force four-star general who previously served as the commander of United States Northern Command and as the commander of North American Aerospace Defense Command.

== Military career ==
O'Shaughnessy was born in North Bay, Ontario, Canada, the son of Terrence O'Shaughnessy, an orthodontist from Cobalt, Ontario. The family moved to Framingham, Massachusetts, in 1968. A 1986 graduate of the United States Air Force Academy, he has commanded at the squadron, group, and wing levels. His commands included the 35th Fighter Wing at Misawa Air Force Base, Japan; the 613th Air and Space Operations Center at Hickam Air Force Base, Hawaii; and the 57th Wing at Nellis Air Force Base, Nevada. O'Shaughnessy has served as the United States Pacific Command Director of Operations, responsible for joint operations in a region encompassing more than half the globe and 36 nations. O'Shaughnessy's joint experience includes a stint as the Joint Staff J5 Deputy Director for Politico-Military Affairs for Asia where he shaped regional planning and policy in the Asia-Pacific and Central Asia regions, supporting the commanders of United States Pacific Command and United States Central Command. O'Shaughnessy was the Deputy Commander, United Nations Command in Korea; Deputy Commander, United States Forces Korea; Commander, Air Component Command, Republic of Korea/United States Combined Forces Command; and Commander, Seventh Air Force, Pacific Air Forces, Osan Air Base, South Korea, as well as the commander of Pacific Air Forces.

O'Shaughnessy is a command pilot with more than 3,000 hours in the F-16 Fighting Falcon, including 168 combat hours.

In August 2019, O'Shaughnessy stirred up the military space community when he said at a defense conference that "Elon Musk’s SpaceX may have just 'completely changed our ability' to sense threats against America using satellite clusters in space" by the new technology demonstrated by SpaceX May launch of the initial group of Starlink megaconstellation. O’Shaughnessy has reportedly had a high-level role at SpaceX's Starshield defense satellite constellation.

According to General Guillot, O'Shaughnessy proposed the SHIELD missile defense system, which stands for Strategic Homeland Integrated Ecosystem for Layered Defense.

== Post-military career ==
Since 2021, O'Shaughnessy is employed by SpaceX where he leads government programs.

== Education ==
- 1986 Distinguished graduate, Bachelor of Science, Aeronautical Engineering, U.S. Air Force Academy, Colorado Springs, Colo.
- 1992 Fighter Weapons Instructor Course, U.S. Air Force Fighter Weapons School, Nellis AFB, Nev.
- 1993 Squadron Officer School, Maxwell AFB, Ala.
- 1996 Master of Aeronautical Science, Embry-Riddle Aeronautical University, Daytona Beach, Fla.
- 1998 Air Command and Staff College, Maxwell AFB, Ala.
- 2003 Industrial College of the Armed Forces, National Defense University, Fort Lesley J. McNair, Washington, D.C.
- 2003 Information Studies Concentration Program, National Defense University, Fort Lesley J. McNair, Washington, D.C.
- 2005 NATO Senior Officer Policy Course, NATO School, Oberammergau, Germany
- 2007 Department of Defense Senior Managers Course in National Security, George Washington University, Washington, D.C.
- 2007 Air Force Enterprise Leadership Course, University of North Carolina at Chapel Hill
- 2009 Combined Air and Space Operations Senior Staff Course, Hurlburt Field, Fla.
- 2011 Joint Force Air Component Commander Course, Maxwell AFB, Ala.
- 2012 Joint Flag Officer Warfighter Course
- 2013 Joint Force Maritime Component Commander Course, Newport, Rhode Island.
- 2015 National Defense University PINNACLE Course, Suffolk, Va.

== Assignments ==
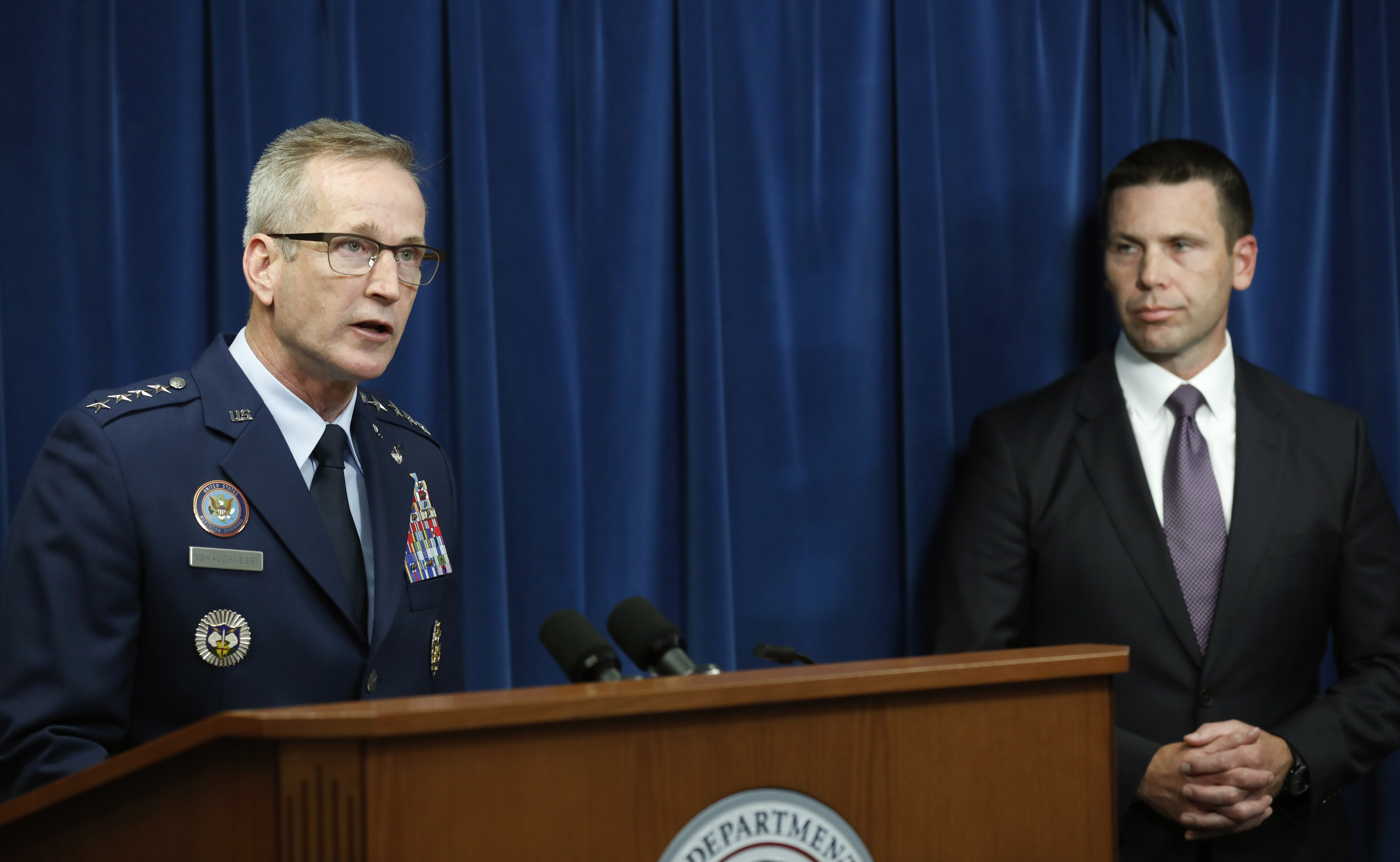
O'Shaughnessy (left) speaks at the Department of Homeland Security in October 2018

1. June 1986 – September 1987, student, undergraduate pilot training, Sheppard AFB, Texas
2. September 1987 – August 1988, student, T-38 lead-in fighter training and F-16 training, Holloman AFB, N.M., and Luke AFB, Ariz.
3. August 1988 – December 1991, F-16 aircraft commander and instructor pilot, Shaw AFB, S.C.
4. January 1992 – June 1992, student, F-16 Fighter Weapons School, Nellis AFB, Nev.
5. July 1992 – July 1993, weapons officer and flight commander, 35th Fighter Squadron, Kunsan AB, South Korea
6. July 1993 – July 1997, assistant operations officer and air-to-ground flight commander, F-16 Division, U.S. Air Force Fighter Weapons School, Nellis AFB, Nev.
7. July 1997 – June 1998, student, Air Command and Staff College, Maxwell AFB, Ala.
8. June 1998 – June 1999, Chief, Air Superiority Weapons Branch, Global Power Programs, Office of the Assistant Secretary of the Air Force for Acquisition, the Pentagon, Washington, D.C.
9. June 1999 – June 2000, Chief, Fighter Programs, Office of Legislative Liaison, Office of the Secretary of the Air Force, the Pentagon, Washington, D.C.
10. June 2000 – April 2001, operations officer, 555th Fighter Squadron, Aviano AB, Italy
11. April 2001 – July 2002, Commander, 510th Fighter Squadron, Aviano AB, Italy
12. August 2002 – June 2003, student, Industrial College of the Armed Forces, National Defense University, Fort Lesley J. McNair, Washington, D.C.
13. June 2003 – August 2004, Chief, Joint Plans and Operations, Supreme Headquarters Allied Powers Europe, Mons, Belgium
14. August 2004 – July 2005, senior special assistant to the Supreme Allied Commander Europe and Commander, U.S. European Command, Supreme Headquarters Allied Powers Europe, Mons, Belgium
15. July 2005 – December 2006, Commander, 57th Adversary Tactics Group, Nellis AFB, Nev.
16. January 2007 – August 2008, Commander, 35th Fighter Wing, Misawa AB, Japan
17. September 2008 – August 2009, Commander, 613th Air and Space Operations Center, Hickam AFB, Hawaii
18. August 2009 – July 2010, Vice Commander, 13th Air Force, Hickam AFB, Hawaii
19. July 2010 – April 2012, Commander, 57th Wing, Nellis AFB, Nev.
20. April 2012 – August 2013, Deputy Director for Politico-Military Affairs for Asia, Joint Staff, the Pentagon, Washington, D.C.
21. August 2013 – October 2014 – Director for Operations, Headquarters, United States Pacific Command, Camp H.M. Smith, Hawaii
22. December 2014 – July 2016, Deputy Commander, United Nations Command Korea; Deputy Commander, U.S. Forces Korea; Commander, Air Component Command, Republic of Korea/U.S. Combined Forces Command; and Commander, 7th Air Force, Pacific Air Forces, Osan AB, South Korea
23. July 2016 – May 2018, Commander, Pacific Air Forces; Air Component Commander for U.S. Pacific Command; and Executive Director, Pacific Air Combat Operations Staff, Joint Base Pearl Harbor-Hickam, Hawaii
24. May 2018 – August 2020, Commander, USNORTHCOM; Commander, NORAD

== Flight information ==
- Rating: Command Pilot
- Flight hours: more than 3,000
- Aircraft flown: F-16, AT/T-38 and T-37

== Awards and decorations ==
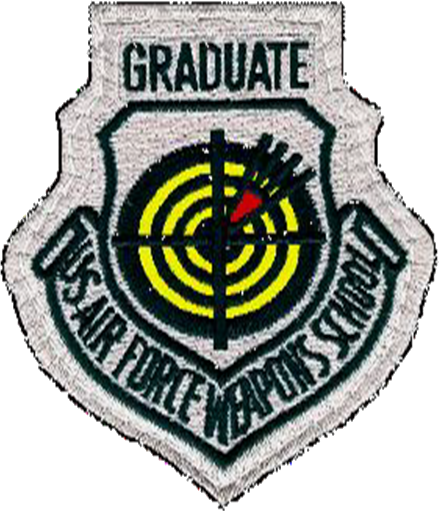
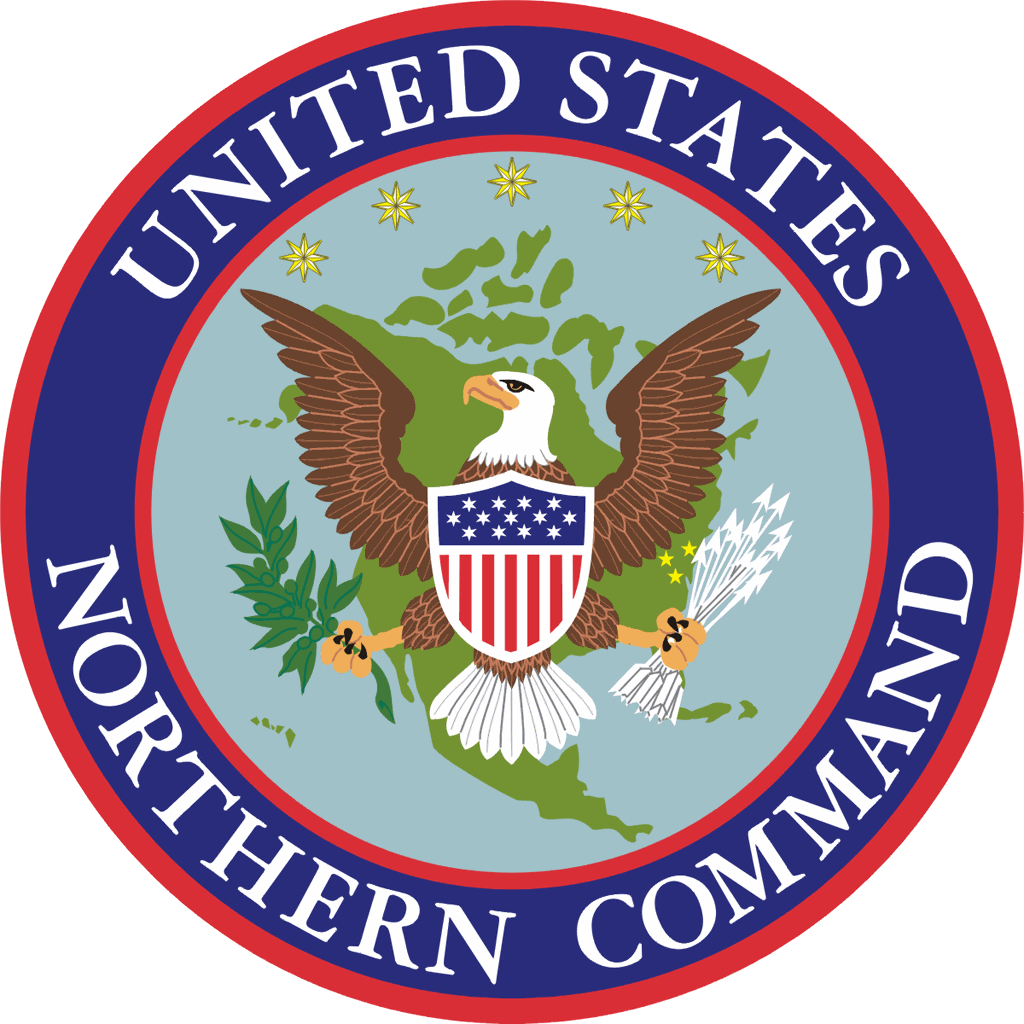
US Air Force Command Pilot Badge
Basic Parachutist Badge
Office of the Joint Chiefs of Staff Identification Badge
Philippine Air Force Gold Wings Badge
Weapons School Graduate Patch
North American Aerospace Defense Command Badge
United States Northern Command Badge

Defense Distinguished Service Medal with one bronze oak leaf cluster
Air Force Distinguished Service Medal
Defense Superior Service Medal with two oak leaf clusters
Legion of Merit with three oak leaf clusters
Meritorious Service Medal with three oak leaf clusters
Air Medal with oak leaf cluster
Aerial Achievement Medal with oak leaf cluster
Air Force Commendation Medal with oak leaf cluster
Air Force Achievement Medal with "V" device and two oak leaf clusters
Joint Meritorious Unit Award with oak leaf cluster
Air Force Outstanding Unit Award with oak leaf cluster
Air Force Organizational Excellence Award
Combat Readiness Medal
National Defense Service Medal with one bronze service star
Armed Forces Expeditionary Medal
Kosovo Campaign Medal with service star
Global War on Terrorism Service Medal
Korea Defense Service Medal
Humanitarian Service Medal
Nuclear Deterrence Operations Service Medal
Air Force Overseas Short Tour Service Ribbon with oak leaf cluster
Air Force Overseas Long Tour Service Ribbon with four oak leaf clusters
Air Force Expeditionary Service Ribbon with two oak leaf clusters
Air Force Longevity Service Award with one silver and three bronze oak leaf clusters
Small Arms Expert Marksmanship Ribbon with bronze service star
Air Force Training Ribbon
Order of National Security Merit, Gukseon Medal (Republic of Korea)
Order of the Rising Sun, Grand Cordon (Japan)
Meritorious Service Cross, Military Division (Canada)
NATO Medal for service with ISAF

== Effective dates of promotion ==
Insignia	Rank	Date
	General	12 July 2016
	Lieutenant General	19 December 2014
	Major General	2 August 2013
	Brigadier General	2 November 2009
	Colonel	1 August 2004
	Lieutenant Colonel	1 May 2000
	Major	1 September 1997
	Captain	28 May 1990
	First Lieutenant	28 May 1988
	Second Lieutenant	28 May 1986

== See also ==
- Notable O' Shaughnessys
- United States federal government continuity of operations

Military offices
Preceded by Russell J. Handy	Commander of the 57th Wing; 2010–2012	Succeeded by Charles L. Moore
Preceded by John F. Newell III	Deputy Director for Politico-Military Affairs for Asia of the Joint Staff; 2012–2013	Succeeded by David R. Stilwell
Preceded by Robert P. Girrier	Director for Operations of the United States Pacific Command; 2013–2014	Succeeded by Mark C. Montgomery
Preceded by Jan-Marc Jouas	Deputy Commander of the United Nations Command and Commander of the Seventh Air Force; 2014–2016	Succeeded by Thomas W. Bergeson
Preceded by Lori Robinson	Commander of the Pacific Air Forces; 2016–2018	Succeeded by Charles Q. Brown Jr.
Preceded by Lori Robinson	Commander of the North American Aerospace Defense Command and United States Northern Command; 2018–2020	Succeeded by Glen D. VanHerck
