= Lori Robinson =

United States Air Force general

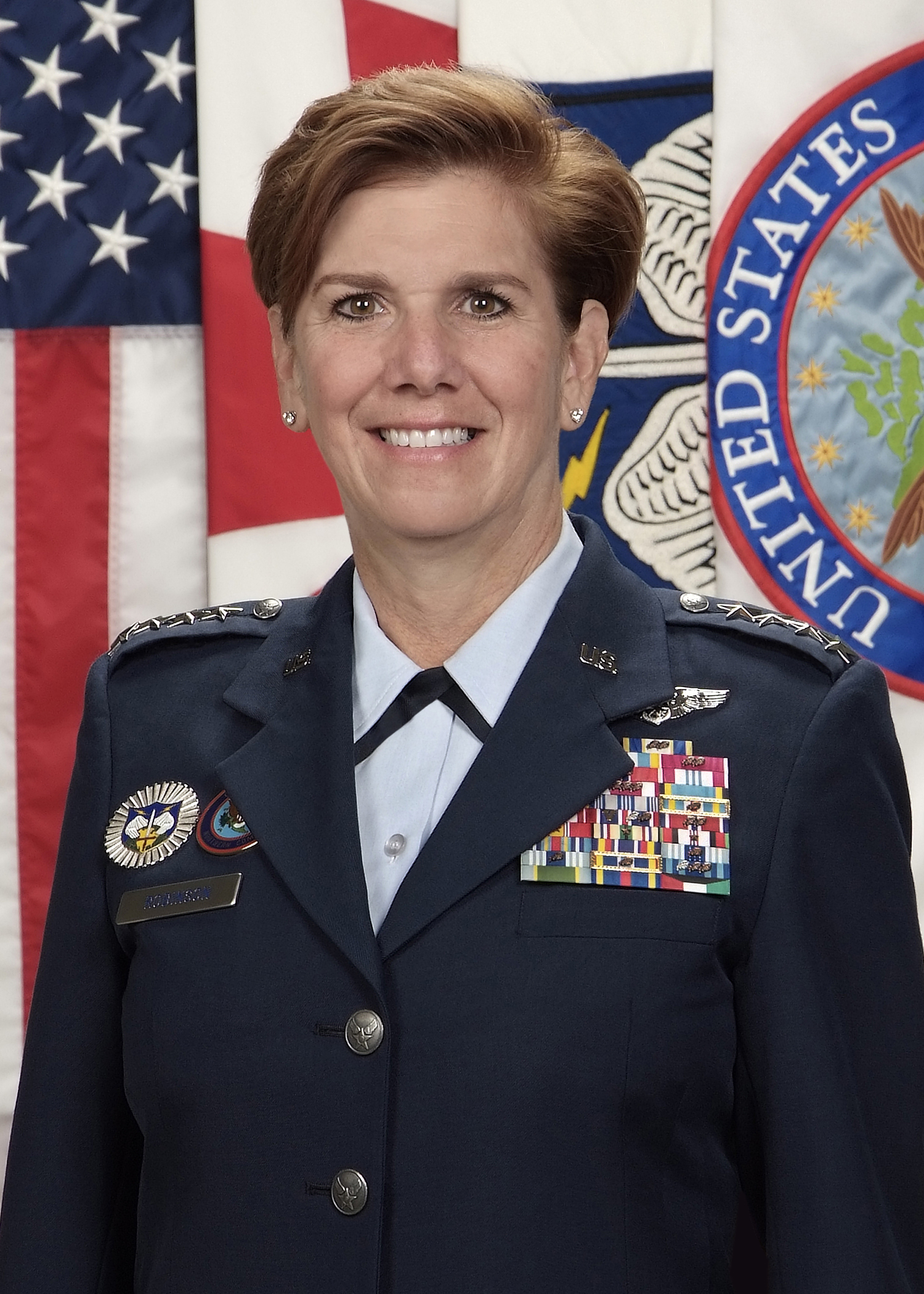
- General Lori Robinson in 2016
- Born: 1958 or 1959 (age 66–67); Big Spring, Texas, U.S.
- Spouse: Major General David A. Robinson
- Military career
- Allegiance: United States
- Branch: United States Air Force
- Service years: 1981–2018
- Rank: General
- Commands: United States Northern Command; North American Aerospace Defense Command; Pacific Air Forces; 552d Air Control Wing; 17th Training Wing
- Conflicts: Gulf War; War in Afghanistan
- Awards: Defense Distinguished Service Medal; Air Force Distinguished Service Medal (3); Defense Superior Service Medal; Legion of Merit (3); Bronze Star Medal (2)

Lori Jean Robinson (born c. 1959) is a retired United States Air Force general who served as commander of the United States Northern Command (USNORTHCOM) and commander of the North American Aerospace Defense Command (NORAD) from May 2016 to May 2018. She was the first female officer in the history of the United States Armed Forces to command a major Unified Combatant Command.

Robinson previously served as commander of Pacific Air Forces; air component commander for United States Pacific Command; and executive director, Pacific Air Combat Operations Staff, Joint Base Pearl Harbor–Hickam, Hawaii. The Pacific Air Forces command has responsibility for Air Force activities spread over half the globe and supports 45,000 airmen serving principally in Japan, South Korea, Hawaii, Alaska, and Guam.

On March 18, 2016, United States Secretary of Defense Ash Carter announced that Robinson would be named by President Barack Obama to replace Admiral William E. Gortney as commander of USNORTHCOM and NORAD, subject to approval by the United States Senate. In 2016 Robinson was named to Time magazine's list of 100 most influential people. Robinson was confirmed and took over from Admiral Gortney on 13 May 2016.

== Military career ==
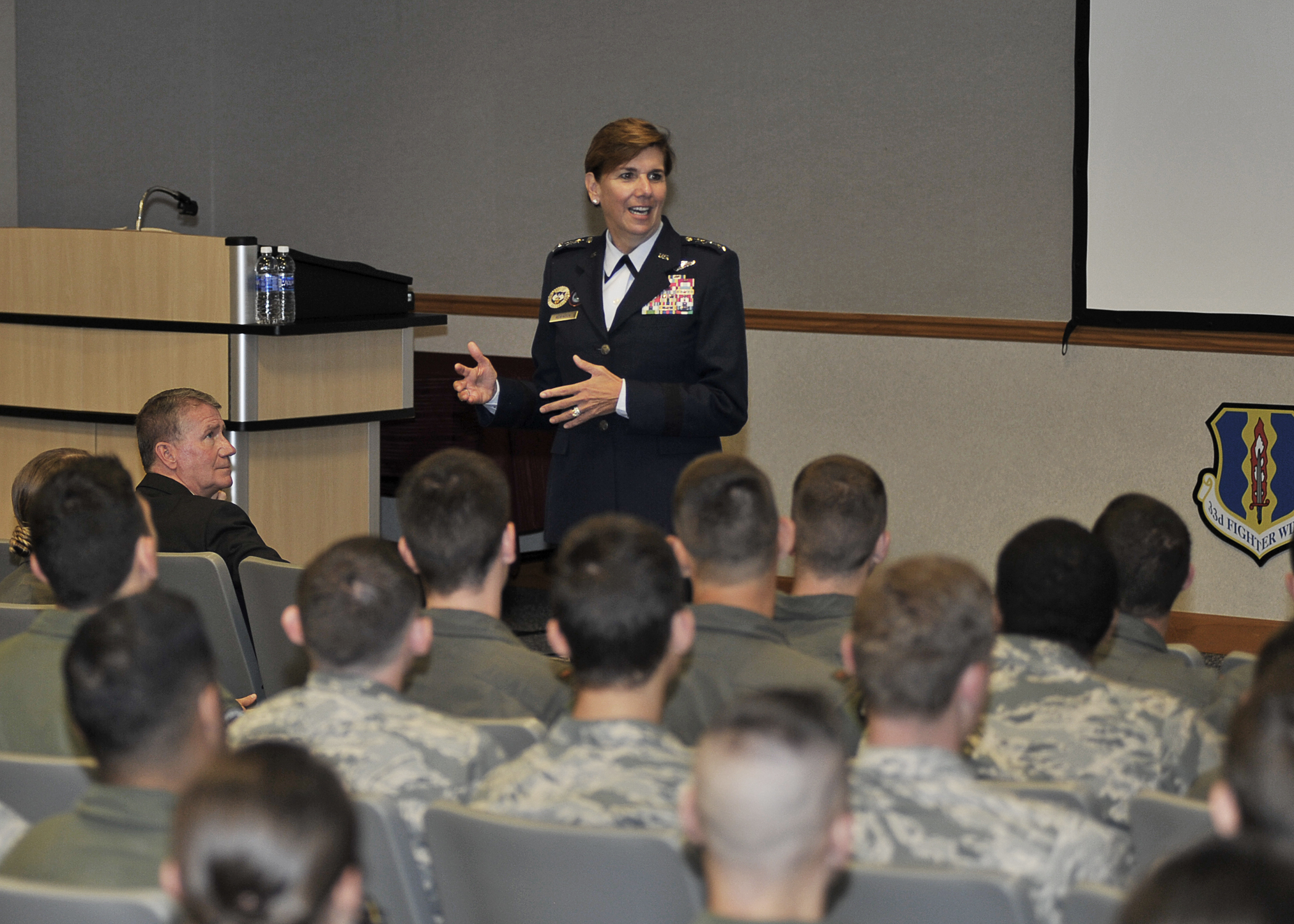
Robinson addressing air battle manager trainees at the 337th Air Control Squadron at Tyndall AFB.

Robinson entered the United States Air Force in 1982 through the Reserve Officers' Training Corps program at the University of New Hampshire. She served in a variety of positions as an Air Battle Manager, including instructor and commander of the Command and Control Operations Division at the United States Air Force Weapons School, as well as Chief of Tactics in the 965th Airborne Warning and Control Squadron. She held staff assignments as command briefer at Headquarters Pacific Air Forces, deputy chief of staff and executive assistant to the director at the Defense Information Systems Agency, and executive officer to the commander of Air Combat Command.

Robinson commanded an operations group, a training wing, and an air control wing. She also deployed as vice commander of the 405th Air Expeditionary Wing, leading more than 2,000 airmen flying B-1 Lancer, KC-135 Stratotanker and E-3 Sentry aircraft in operations Enduring Freedom and Iraqi Freedom. Robinson was an Air Force Fellow at The Brookings Institution in Washington, D.C., and has served at the Pentagon as director of the Secretary of the Air Force and chief of staff of the Air Force Executive Action Group. She was also deputy director for force application and support, Directorate of Force Structure, Resources and Assessment, Joint Staff, the Pentagon, Washington, D.C. Following this, Robinson was director, Legislative Liaison, Office of the Secretary of the Air Force, the Pentagon, Washington, D.C., and the vice commander, Air Combat Command, Langley Air Force Base, Virginia.

On September 21, 2007, Robinson made history when she became the first air battle manager and first woman 552nd ACW commander to be frocked to brigadier general while stationed at Tinker Air Force Base, Oklahoma.

In 2014 Robinson was chosen to be commander of the Pacific Air Forces in Hawaii, making her the first United States female four-star commander of combat forces. On May 13, 2016, she became the commanding general of United States Northern Command and was the first woman to command a unified combatant command. On May 24, 2018, General Robinson transferred command of NORAD and NORTHCOM to General Terrence J. O'Shaughnessy. Robinson retired from the Air Force on June 7, 2018.

== Personal life ==
Robinson is married to retired Air Force Major General David A. Robinson.

Robinson's stepdaughter, United States Air Force Reserve Second Lieutenant Taryn Ashley Robinson (b. February 1, 1983), was critically injured, and her civilian flight instructor, Col James Weaver, USAF (Ret), was killed, when their plane impacted terrain on September 21, 2005. Lieutenant Robinson later succumbed to her injuries and died on January 10, 2006. Lieutenant Robinson was an Air Force Academy graduate (Class of 2005), as was Weaver (Class of 1963).

== Education ==
- 1981 Bachelor of Arts in English, University of New Hampshire, Durham, New Hampshire
- 1986 Squadron Officer School, Maxwell AFB, Alabama
- 1986 United States Air Force Fighter Weapons School, distinguished graduate, Nellis AFB, Nevada
- 1992 Master of Arts in education leadership and management, Troy State University, Troy, Alabama
- 1995 Master's degree in national security and strategic studies, College of Naval Command and Staff, Naval War College, Newport, R.I.
- 2001 Air War College, by correspondence
- 2002 Air Force Fellow, The Brookings Institution, Washington, D.C.
- 2005 Senior Executive Fellows Program, Harvard University, Cambridge, Massachusetts

== Assignments ==
1. January 1982 – June 1982, student, Basic Air Weapons Controller School, Tyndall AFB, Fla.
2. June 1982 – January 1983, air weapons controller, Homestead AFB, Fla.
3. January 1983 – January 1985, instructor air weapons controller and live-fire senior director, 81st Range Control Squadron, Tyndall AFB, Fla.
4. January 1985 – February 1986, Chief of Training; and Chief of Standards and Evaluations, 848th Air Control and Weapons Squadron, Wallace Air Station, the Philippines
5. February 1986 – September 1986, air weapons controller, Air Weapons Controller Division, USAF Fighter Weapons School, Nellis AFB, Nev.
6. September 1986 – December 1986, student, USAF Fighter Weapons School, Nellis AFB, Nev.
7. December 1986 – October 1989, instructor and course manager, Air Weapon Control Division, USAF Fighter Weapons School, Nellis AFB, Nev.
8. October 1989 – August 1992, Chief of Current Operations and command briefer, Headquarters Pacific Air Forces, Hickam AFB, Hawaii
9. August 1992 – May 1993, air weapons controller, 552nd Air Control Wing, Tinker AFB, Okla.
10. June 1993 – June 1994, Chief, Weapons and Tactics Branch, 965th Airborne Warning and Control Squadron, Tinker AFB, Okla.
11. July 1994 – June 1995, student, College of Naval Command and Staff, Naval War College, Newport, R.I.
12. June 1995 – September 1995, student, Armed Forces Staff College, Norfolk, Va.
13. September 1995 – December 1997, command, control and communication officer, deputy chief of staff, and executive assistant to the director, Defense Information Systems Agency, Arlington, Va.
14. December 1997 – June 1998, student, mission crew commander training, Nellis AFB, Nev.
15. June 1998 – February 2000, commander, Command and Control Operations Division, USAF Weapons School, Nellis AFB, Nev.
16. February 2000 – July 2001, executive officer to the commander, Air Combat Command, Langley AFB, Va.
17. July 2001 – June 2002, Air Force Fellow, The Brookings Institution, Washington, D.C.
18. June 2002 – August 2004, commander, 552nd Operations Group, Tinker AFB, Okla. (March 2003 – May 2003, vice commander, 405th Air Expeditionary Wing, Southwest Asia)
19. August 2004 – August 2005, commander, 17th Training Wing, Goodfellow AFB, Texas
20. August 2005 – September 2006, director, Secretary of the Air Force and chief of staff of the Air Force Executive Action Group, Washington, D.C.
21. September 2006 – May 2007, Chief, Air Force House Liaison Office, Legislative Liaison, Office of the Secretary of the Air Force, Headquarters U.S. Air Force, Washington, D.C.
22. May 2007 – August 2008, commander, 552nd Air Control Wing, Tinker AFB, Okla.
23. September 2008 – October 2010, deputy director for Force Application and Support, Directorate of Force Structure, Resources and Assessment, Joint Staff, the Pentagon, Washington, D.C.
24. October 2010 – June 2012, director, Legislative Liaison, Office of the Secretary of the Air Force, the Pentagon, Washington, D.C.
25. June 2012 – April 2013, deputy commander, U.S. Air Forces Central Command; deputy, Combined Force Air Component Commander, U.S. Central Command, Southwest Asia.
26. May 2013 – October 2014, vice commander, Air Combat Command, Langley AFB, Va
27. October 2014 – May 2016, commander, Pacific Air Forces; Air Component Commander for U.S. Pacific Command; and executive director, Pacific Air Combat Operations Staff, Joint Base Pearl Harbor–Hickam, Hawaii
28. May 2016 – May 2018, commander, USNORTHCOM; commander, NORAD

== Flight experience ==
- Rating: Senior Air Battle Manager
- Flight hours: more than 900
- Aircraft: E-3B/C and E-8C

== Awards and decorations ==

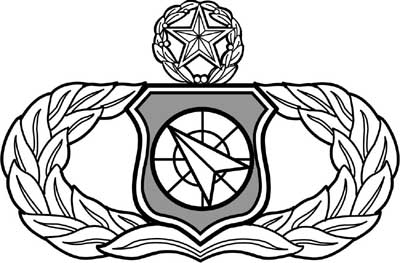

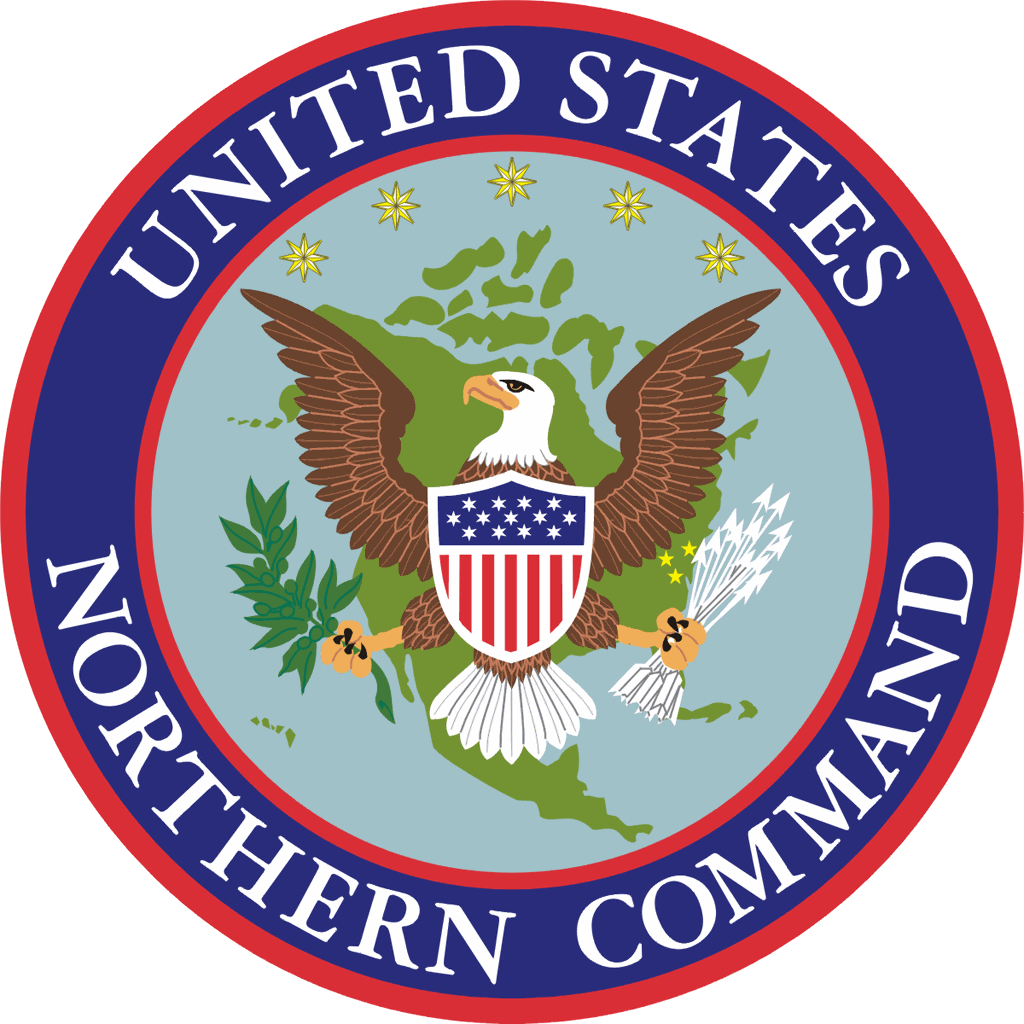

Senior Air Battle Manager Badge
Master Weapons Director Badge
Defense Distinguished Service Medal	Air Force Distinguished Service Medal with two bronze oak leaf clusters	Defense Superior Service Medal
Legion of Merit with two bronze oak leaf clusters	Bronze Star Medal with one bronze oak leaf cluster	Defense Meritorious Service Medal
Meritorious Service Medal with three bronze oak leaf clusters	Aerial Achievement Medal	Air Force Commendation Medal with two bronze oak leaf clusters
Air Force Achievement Medal	Joint Meritorious Unit Award with one bronze oak leaf cluster	Air Force Meritorious Unit Award
Air Force Outstanding Unit Award with "V" Device and one silver and one bronze oak leaf clusters	Air Force Organizational Excellence Award with two bronze oak leaf clusters	National Defense Service Medal with one bronze service star
Southwest Asia Service Medal with one bronze campaign star	Afghanistan Campaign Medal with one bronze campaign star	Global War on Terrorism Expeditionary Medal
Global War on Terrorism Service Medal	Air Force Overseas Short Tour Service Ribbon with one bronze oak leaf cluster	Air Force Overseas Long Tour Service Ribbon with one bronze oak leaf cluster
Air Force Expeditionary Service Ribbon with gold frame and one bronze oak leaf cluster	Air Force Longevity Service Award with one silver and three bronze oak leaf clusters	Small Arms Expert Marksmanship Ribbon
Air Force Training Ribbon	Canada Meritorious Service Cross, Military Division	Kuwait Liberation Medal (Kuwait)
North American Aerospace Defense Command Badge | United States Northern Command Badge

== Effective dates of promotion ==
- Second Lieutenant May 24, 1981
- First Lieutenant September 11, 1983
- Captain September 11, 1985
- Major January 1, 1994
- Lieutenant Colonel July 1, 1998
- Colonel August 1, 2002
- Brigadier General July 22, 2008
- Major General May, 2011
- Lieutenant General May 20, 2013
- General October 16, 2014

== See also ==
- List of female United States military generals and flag officers
- List of United States Air Force lieutenant generals from 2010 to 2019
- Timeline of women in warfare and the military in the United States from 2011–present
- List of American women's firsts

Military offices
Preceded by Herbert J. Carlisle	Commander of the Pacific Air Forces; 2014–2016	Succeeded by Terrence J. O'Shaughnessy
Preceded by William E. Gortney	Commander of the United States Northern Command; Commander of the North American Aerospace Defense Command; 2016–2018	Succeeded by Terrence J. O'Shaughnessy
