= David A. Robinson =

United States Air Force general

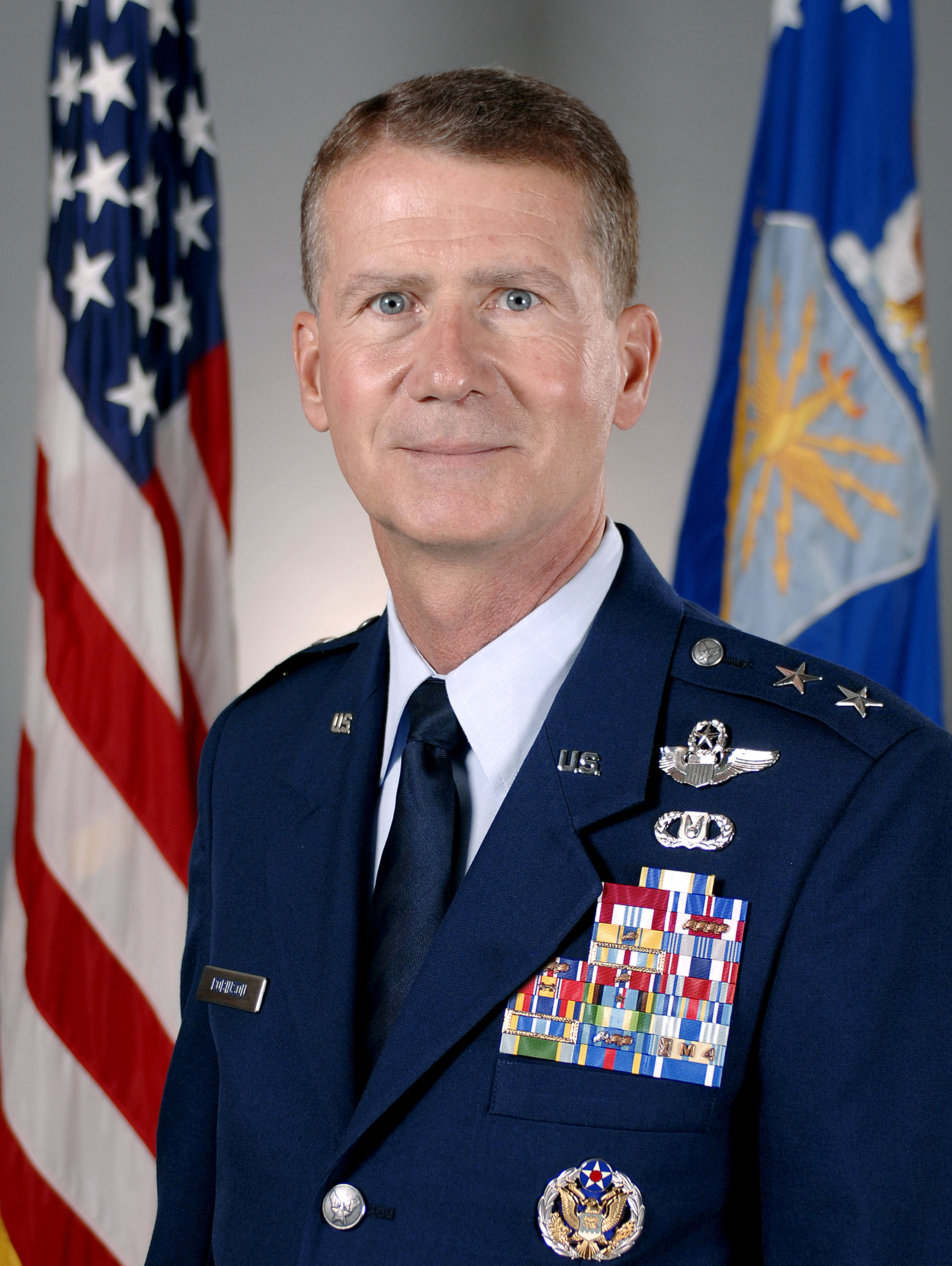
- Born: 1954 (age 71–72); Woonsocket, Rhode Island, United States
- Spouse: General Lori Robinson
- Military career
- Allegiance: United States
- Branch: United States Air Force
- Service years: 1976–2008
- Rank: Major General
- Commands: 701st Combat Operations Squadron
- Awards: Air Force Distinguished Service Medal; Legion of Merit; Distinguished Flying Cross

David A. Robinson (born 1954) is a retired major general in the United States Air Force who served as mobilization assistant to the Chief of the Air Force Reserve, Headquarters United States Air Force, Washington, D.C.

== Military career ==
Robinson was born in Woonsocket, Rhode Island, and raised in Fairfield, Connecticut. He is a 1976 honor graduate of the United States Air Force Academy. A career fighter and instructor pilot, he flew combat support missions in the KC-135R during Operation Deny Flight. Robinson has served as a squadron operations officer, squadron commander and wing vice commander. He has held key staff assignments at the Joint Staff and Secretary of the Air Force levels. He has also served a tour as the director of the Combined Air Operations Center, Prince Sultan Air Base, Saudi Arabia.

In his civilian occupation, Robinson is employed as a captain with a major airline.

== Family and personal ==
Robinson is married to Lori Robinson, a retired four-star general in the United States Air Force, and the first female commander of a Unified Combatant Command when she was named as commander of the United States Northern Command and North American Aerospace Defense Command in May 2016.

Robinson's daughter, United States Air Force Reserve Second Lieutenant Taryn Ashley Robinson (born February 1, 1983), was critically injured and her civilian flight instructor was killed when their plane impacted terrain on September 21, 2005. Taryn later succumbed to her injuries and died on January 10, 2006. Lieutenant Robinson was enrolled in a government undergraduate pilot training introductory flight program, and this was her second flight. Taryn's flight instructor, Col James L. Weaver, USAF (Ret), age 64, was flying the Diamond Aircraft Industries DA20-C1, single-engine airplane, N63PA, when it clipped two high-tension power cables while simulating engine failure near Pleasanton, Texas. Lieutenant Robinson was an Air Force Academy graduate (Class 2005), as was Weaver (Class of 1963).

== Education ==
- 1976 Bachelor of Science degree in biological sciences, honor graduate, U.S. Air Force Academy, Colorado Springs, Colorado
- 1977 Squadron Officer School, by correspondence
- 1983 Master's degree in business administration, Phillips University
- 1984 Air Command and Staff College, by seminar
- 1989 Armed Forces Staff College, Norfolk, Virginia
- 1993 Air War College, (by seminar)
- 1995 Reserve Officer Strategy and Policy Adjunct Course, Naval War College, Rhode Island
- 1996 Reserve Components National Security Course, National Defense University, Fort Lesley J. McNair, Washington, D.C.
- 2001 Combined Force Air Component Commander Course, Maxwell AFB, Alabama
- 2002 Capstone, Fort Lesley J. McNair, Washington, D.C.

== Assignments ==
- August 1976 – July 1977, student, undergraduate pilot training, Vance AFB, Okla.
- September 1977 – December 1977, T-38 instructor pilot training, Randolph AFB, Texas
- January 1978 – January 1981, T-38 instructor pilot and flight examiner, 25th Flying Training Squadron, Vance AFB, Oklahoma
- February 1981 – April 1981, student, fighter lead-in training, 436th Tactical Fighter Training Squadron, Holloman AFB, N.M.
- April 1981 – September 1981, student, F-15 upgrade training, 555th Tactical Fighter Training Squadron, Luke AFB, Ariz.
- September 1981 – November 1983, F-15 pilot and wing executive officer, 59th Tactical Fighter Squadron, Eglin AFB, Florida
- November 1983 – September 1986, F-15 instructor pilot and flight examiner, 426th Tactical Fighter Training Squadron, Luke AFB, Arizona
- September 1986 – November 1986, student, F-16 upgrade training, 310th Tactical Fighter Training Squadron, Luke AFB, Arizona
- November 1986 – January 1989, F-16 demonstration pilot and squadron operations officer, U.S. Air Force Air Demonstration Squadron, the Thunderbirds, Nellis AFB, Nev.
- January 1989 – June 1989, student, Armed Forces Staff College, Norfolk, Virginia
- June 1989 – August 1989, special assistant to the commander, 57th Wing, Nellis AFB, Nevada
- August 1989 – June 1992, chief, Air Operations Branch, Headquarters U.S. Pacific Command, Camp H.M. Smith, Hawaii
- June 1992 – January 1993, electronic warfare officer, Headquarters U.S. Pacific Command, Camp H.M. Smith, Hawaii
- January 1993 – October 1995, KC-135R aircraft commander, operations support flight commander and vice commander, 507th Air Refueling Wing, Tinker AFB, Okla.
- October 1995 – April 1998, senior individual mobilization augmentee to the Deputy Under Secretary of the Air Force, International Affairs, Headquarters U.S. Air Force, Washington, D.C.
- April 1998 – July 1999, commander, 701st Combat Operations Squadron, March Air Reserve Base, Calif.
- July 1999 – January 2001, mobilization assistant to the commander, Air Force Doctrine Center, Maxwell AFB, Ala.
- January 2001 – June 2005, mobilization assistant to the director, Aerospace Operations, Headquarters Air Combat Command, Langley AFB, Virginia
- June 2005 – January 2006, mobilization assistant to the deputy chief of staff for air and space operations, Headquarters U.S. Air Force, Washington, D.C.
- January 2006 – August 2008, mobilization assistant to the chief of the Air Force Reserve, Headquarters U.S. Air Force, Washington, D.C.

== Flight Information ==
- Rating: Command pilot
- Flight hours: 8,800
- Aircraft flown: T-37, T-38, F-15-A/B/D, F-16-A/B/D, KC-135R and B-737

== Major awards and decorations ==
- Air Force Distinguished Service Medal
- Legion of Merit
- Distinguished Flying Cross
- Defense Meritorious Service Medal
- Meritorious Service Medal with four oak leaf clusters
- Air Force Commendation Medal with oak leaf cluster
- Air Force Achievement Medal

== Effective dates of promotion ==
- Second Lieutenant June 2, 1976
- First Lieutenant June 2, 1978
- Captain June 2, 1980
- Major July 1, 1987
- Lieutenant Colonel July 1, 1991
- Colonel August 1, 1995
- Brigadier General July 31, 2000
- Major General March 1, 2003
