= James DeLoughry =

James P. DeLoughry
- Born: January 1, 1950 (age 76); Bronx, New York
- Military career
- Allegiance: United States of America
- Branch: United States Air Force
- Service years: 1971-2002
- Rank: Colonel
- Commands: Air Mobility Command, Intelligence; Combined Intelligence Center; 1st Tactical Fighter Wing, Intelligence
- Awards: Defense Superior Service Medal (1); Defense Meritorious Service Medal (1); Legion of Merit; Meritorious Service Medal (2); Joint Service Commendation Medal; Air Force Commendation Medal (1); Joint Service Achievement Medal

Colonel James P. DeLoughry, USAF is the former Chief of Intelligence, Air Mobility Command.

DeLoughry was commissioned at Manhattan College, New York City, New York, in May 1971 as a distinguished graduate of the Reserve Office Training Corps. After earning a master's degree in Strategic Studies at the University of Lancaster, United Kingdom, he was assigned as an air intelligence officer at the 544th Aerospace Reconnaissance and Technical Wing, Offutt Air Force Base, Nebraska. In 1975, Colonel DeLoughry served as a wing intelligence officer with the 388th Tactical Fighter Wing at Korat Royal Thai Air Base, in Thailand.

Beginning in 1976, DeLoughry served in a variety of staff intelligence assignments at Strategic Air Command Headquarters. In 1976, he was assigned to Defense Intelligence Agency where he served as an advisor to the United States Strategic Arms Limitations Talks delegation, and later as a member of an operations team in the NMCC (National Military Command Center).

DeLoughry was assigned as a Middle East Analyst with the United States European Command in Stuttgart, Germany in 1984. After attending Armed Forces Staff College in 1987, he served as Chief of Intelligence Watch for Headquarters Tactical Air Command, Langley Air Force Base, Virginia. In 1989, DeLoughry was selected as the Chief of Intelligence for the 1st Tactical Fighter Wing, deploying with the wing to Dhahran, Saudi Arabia in August 1990.

After completing studies at the NATO Defense College in Rome, Italy in 1991, DeLoughry was assigned as Deputy Chief Politico-Military Affairs Division for the Directorate of Plans, United States Central Command in Tampa, Florida. There his duties focused on access and basing negotiations, defense cooperation agreements and bilateral consultation with regional allies.

DeLoughry returned to Langley Air Force Base in 1994 as Chief, Intelligence Force Management Division, Headquarters Air Combat Command. In 1996, he assumed command of the Air Combat Command Intelligence Squadron.

In 1997, he was appointed Commander, Combined Intelligence Center, North American Aerospace Defense Command and United States Space Command, Peterson Air Force Base, Colorado Springs, Colorado.

His final assignment in 1999 was Chief of Intelligence for Air Mobility Command, Scott Air Force Base, Illinois. He was responsible for intelligence support for the Command's passenger, cargo, and tanker fleet of 1300 aircraft. He retired from active duty in October 2002.

== Education ==
- 1971 Bachelor's degree in Political Science, Manhattan College, New York City, New York
- 1973 Master's degree in Strategic Studies, University of Lancaster, Lancaster, England
- 1987 Armed Forces Staff College
- 1991 NATO Defense College

== Effective dates of promotion ==
- Second Lieutenant May 23, 1971
- First Lieutenant May 14, 1974
- Captain May 14, 1976
- Major February 1, 1984
- Lieutenant Colonel July 1, 1988
- Colonel December 1, 1993

== Major awards and decorations ==
Legion of Merit
Joint Service Commendation Medal
Joint Service Achievement Medal
Defense Superior Service Medal with oak leaf cluster
Defense Meritorious Service Medal with oak leaf cluster
Air Force Commendation Medal with oak leaf cluster
Meritorious Service Medal with two oak leaf clusters
