= Kevin Huyck =

U.S. Air Force general

Kevin A. Huyck
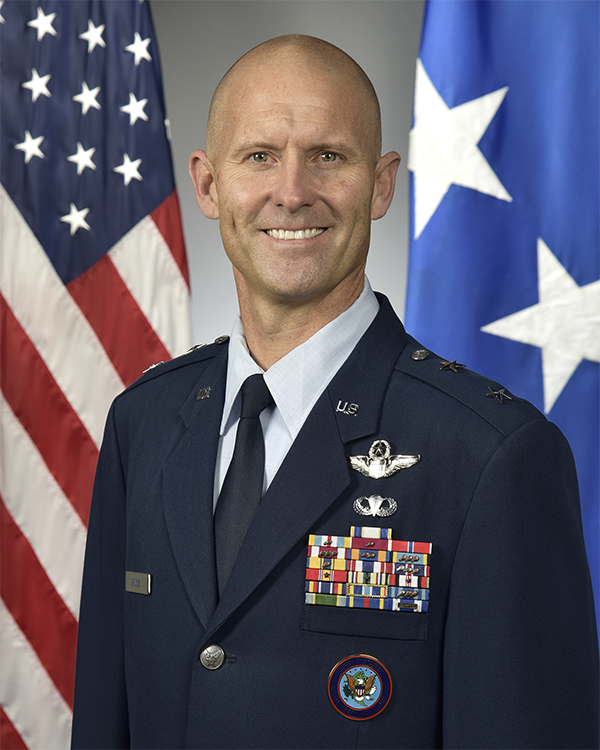
- Military career
- Allegiance: United States
- Branch: United States Air Force
- Service years: 1990–2022
- Rank: Major General
- Commands: 1st Fighter Wing; 49th Operations Group; 95th Fighter Squadron
- Conflicts: War in Afghanistan
- Awards: Air Force Distinguished Service Medal; Defense Superior Service Medal (2); Legion of Merit (2); Bronze Star Medal

Kevin A. Huyck is a retired United States Air Force major general who last served as the director for operations of the United States Northern Command. He previously held the same position for the Air Combat Command.

Military offices
Preceded by Kevin J. Robbins	Commander of the 1st Fighter Wing; 2013–2015	Succeeded by Peter Fesler
Preceded by ???	Deputy Chief of Staff for Operations of the NATO Allied Air Command; 2015–2017	Succeeded by Charles Corcoran
Preceded by ???	Deputy Director of Operations of the North American Aerospace Defense Command; 2017–2018	Succeeded by Peter Fesler
Preceded by Andrew J. Toth	Director for Operations of the Air Combat Command; 2018–2020	Succeeded by Mark H. Slocum
Preceded by Gregory M. Guillot	Director for Operations of the United States Northern Command; 2020–2022	Succeeded by Joseph M. Lestorti
