= William R. Looney III =

United States Air Force general

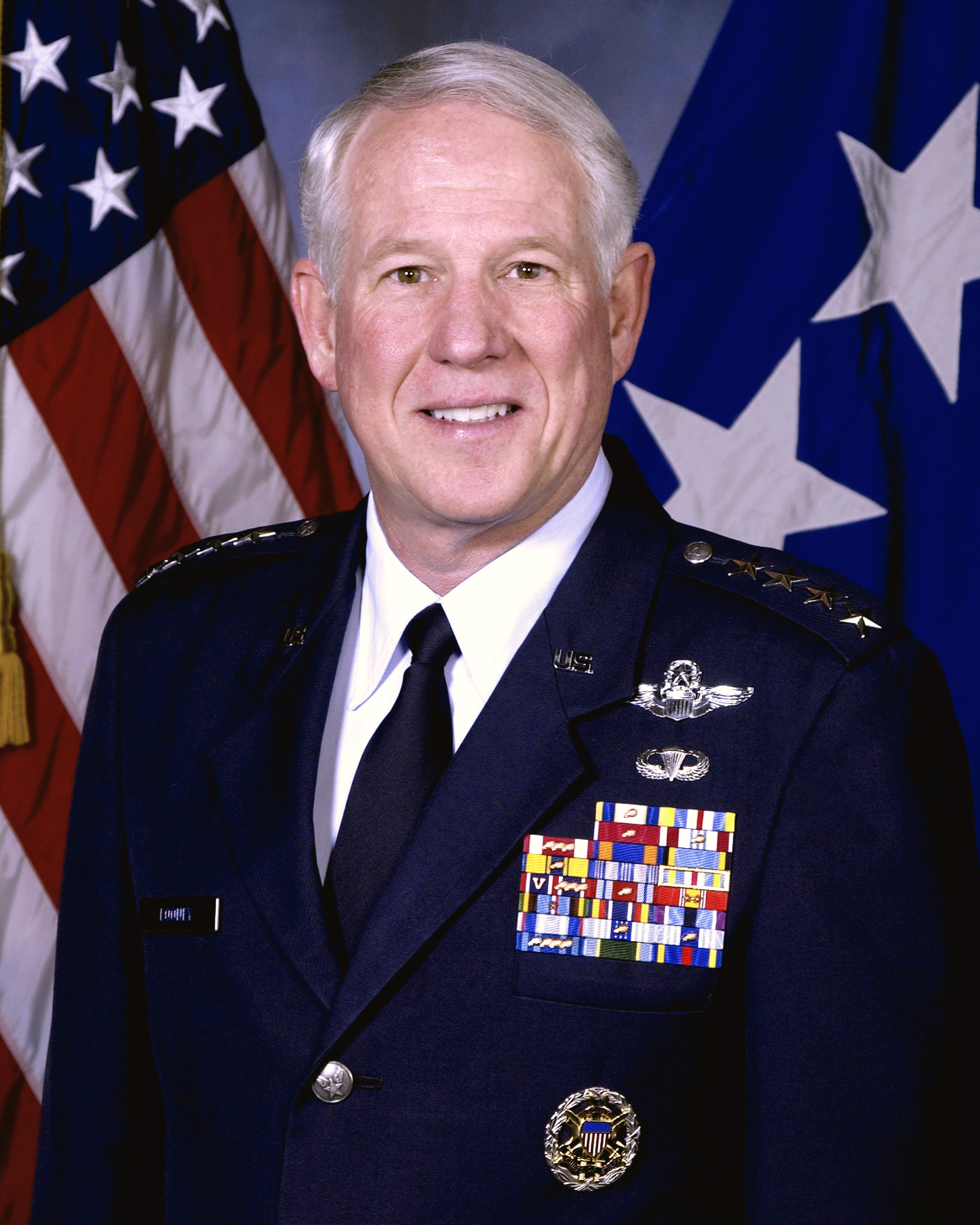
- General William Looney, USAF
- Born: March 5, 1949 (age 77); Norman, Oklahoma, U.S.
- Military career
- Allegiance: United States of America
- Branch: United States Air Force
- Service years: 1972–2008
- Rank: General
- Commands: Air Education and Training Command; 22nd Tactical Fighter Squadron; 33rd Fighter Wing; 1st Fighter Wing; Armed Forces Staff College; Space Warfare Center; 14th Air Force; Electronic Systems Center; Aeronautical Systems Center; Air Education and Training Command
- Conflicts: Operation Southern Watch; Operation Uphold Democracy
- Awards: Air Force Distinguished Service Medal (2); Defense Superior Service Medal; Legion of Merit (2); Defense Meritorious Service Medal (2); Meritorious Service Medal (4)
- Website: Looney's Official website

General William R. Looney III, USAF (born March 5, 1949) was the 28th Commander, Air Education and Training Command (AETC), Randolph Air Force Base, Texas. As commander, he was responsible for the recruiting, training and education of Air Force personnel. His command included the Air Force Recruiting Service, two numbered air forces and Air University. Air Education and Training Command consists of 13 bases, more than 66,000 active-duty members and 15,000 civilians. General Looney was succeeded by General Stephen R. Lorenz on July 2, 2008, and retired from the Air Force on August 1, 2008. Since his retirement from the Air Force, Looney has taken a position as a board member at Trident University International.

== Education ==
Looney graduated from the United States Air Force Academy in 1972, where he commanded the cadet wing in his senior year. His academic credentials include:

- 1972 Bachelor of Science degree, United States Air Force Academy, Colorado Springs, Colorado
- 1977 Squadron Officer School, Maxwell AFB, Alabama
- 1979 Master's degree in management, Central Michigan University
- 1983 Armed Forces Staff College, Norfolk, Virginia
- 1990 National War College, Fort Lesley J. McNair, Washington, D.C.
- 1993 Executive Warfare Course, Eglin AFB, Florida
- 1997 Joint Flag Officer Warfighting Course, Maxwell AFB, Alabama
- 1997 Joint Force Air Component Commander Course, Maxwell AFB, Alabama
- 1997 National Security Leadership Course, Syracuse University and Johns Hopkins University, Baltimore, Maryland
- 1998 Undergraduate Space and Missile Training Staff Course, Vandenberg AFB, California
- 1999 National and International Security Seminar, John F. Kennedy School of Government, Harvard University, Cambridge, Massachusetts

== Assignments ==
Looney has commanded a flight, a fighter squadron, two fighter wings, an air expeditionary force, a military college, a warfare center, a numbered air force and two acquisition centers. His assignments:

- June 1972 - August 1973, student, undergraduate pilot training], Sheppard AFB, Texas
- August 1973 - December 1974, AC-130 gunship pilot, Ubon Royal Thai AFB, Thailand
- January 1975 - April 1978, T-38 instructor pilot, 50th Flying Training Squadron, Columbus Air Force Base
- April 1978 - April 1979, participant, Air Staff Training Program, Directorate of Personnel Plans, The Pentagon, Washington, D.C.
- April 1979 - December 1979, student, F-15 training, Luke AFB, Arizona
- January 1980 - February 1983, instructor pilot, flight commander and assistant operations officer, 94th Tactical Fighter Squadron, Langley AFB, Virginia
- February 1983 - July 1983, student, Armed Forces Staff College, Norfolk, Virginia.
- July 1983 - June 1985, aide-de-camp to Deputy Commander in Chief, U.S. European Command, Stuttgart, West Germany
- July 1985 - November 1986, Chief of Wing Plans, 36th Tactical Fighter Wing, Bitburg Air Base, West Germany
- November 1986 - January 1988, operations officer, 22nd Tactical Fighter Squadron, Bitburg AB, West Germany
- January 1988 - June 1989, Commander, 22nd Tactical Fighter Squadron, Bitburg AB, West Germany
- July 1989 - June 1990, student, National War College, Fort Lesley J. McNair, Washington, D.C.
- June 1990 - July 1992, Conventional Negotiations Branch Chief, Directorate of Strategic Plans and Policy, Office of the Joint Chiefs of Staff, Washington, D.C.
- July 1992 - June 1993, Vice Commander, Air Forces Iceland, Keflavik Naval Air Station, Iceland
- June 1993 - May 1995, Commander, 33rd Fighter Wing, Eglin Air Force Base, Florida.
- May 1995 - July 1996, Commander, 1st Fighter Wing, Langley Air Force Base, Virginia, and Air Expeditionary Force II, Azraq, Jordan
- July 1996 - June 1998, Commandant, Armed Forces Staff College, Norfolk, Virginia
- June 1998 - May 1999, Commander, Space Warfare Center, Schriever AFB, Colorado
- May 1999 - June 2000, Director of Operations, Headquarters Air Force Space Command, Peterson AFB, Colorado
- June 2000 - May 2002, Commander, 14th Air Force, and Component Commander, Space Air Forces, U.S. Space Command, Vandenberg AFB, California
- May 2002 - December 2003, Commander, Electronic Systems Center, Air Force Materiel Command, Hanscom AFB, Massachusetts
- December 2003 - June 2005, Commander, Aeronautical Systems Center, Wright-Patterson AFB, Ohio
- June 2005 - July 2008, Commander, Air Education and Training Command, Randolph AFB, Texas
- July 2008 - Retired (Effective August 1)

== Flight information ==
General Looney flew 62 combat hours in the F-15 Eagle in support of Operation Southern Watch and commanded Joint Task Force 86–2 in support of Operation Uphold Democracy. He is a command pilot with more than 3,900 flying hours, including 2,500 in the F-15.

- Rating: Command pilot
- Flight hours: More than 3,900
- Aircraft flown: AC-130, T-38, T-37, F-15 and C-21

== Awards and decorations ==
US Air Force Command Pilot Badge
Senior Missile Operations Badge
Senior Space Operations Badge
Basic Parachutist Badge
Office of the Joint Chiefs of Staff Identification Badge

Air Force Distinguished Service Medal with one bronze oak leaf cluster
Defense Superior Service Medal
Legion of Merit with oak leaf cluster
Defense Meritorious Service Medal with oak leaf cluster
Meritorious Service Medal with three oak leaf clusters
Air Medal
Aerial Achievement Medal
Air Force Commendation Medal with oak leaf cluster
Air Force Achievement Medal
Joint Meritorious Unit Award
Air Force Outstanding Unit Award with Valor device and three oak leaf clusters
Combat Readiness Medal with oak leaf cluster
National Defense Service Medal with two bronze service stars
Armed Forces Expeditionary Medal with service star
Global War on Terrorism Service Medal
Humanitarian Service Medal
Air and Space Campaign Medal
Air Force Overseas Short Tour Service Ribbon
Air Force Overseas Long Tour Service Ribbon
Air Force Longevity Service Award with one silver and three bronze oak leaf clusters
Small Arms Expert Marksmanship Ribbon
Air Force Training Ribbon

- The General received the Order of the Sword in 2008.

== Promotion Dates ==
- Second Lieutenant June 7, 1972
- First Lieutenant June 7, 1974
- Captain June 7, 1976
- Major November 1, 1981
- Lieutenant Colonel March 1, 1986
- Colonel March 1, 1991
- Brigadier General March 1, 1996
- Major General May 1, 1999
- Lieutenant General June 1, 2002
- General August 1, 2005

== Quotes ==
"The vast majority of Airmen we train are going to be somewhere in harm's way within the next year or two. It is up to us to impart to them the talent and skill they need to accomplish their mission in a world-class fashion and at the same time make sure we get them back safely to the families that love them." https://www.aetc.af.mil/News/story/id/123067441/
