= Jason Hinds =

U.S. Air Force general officer

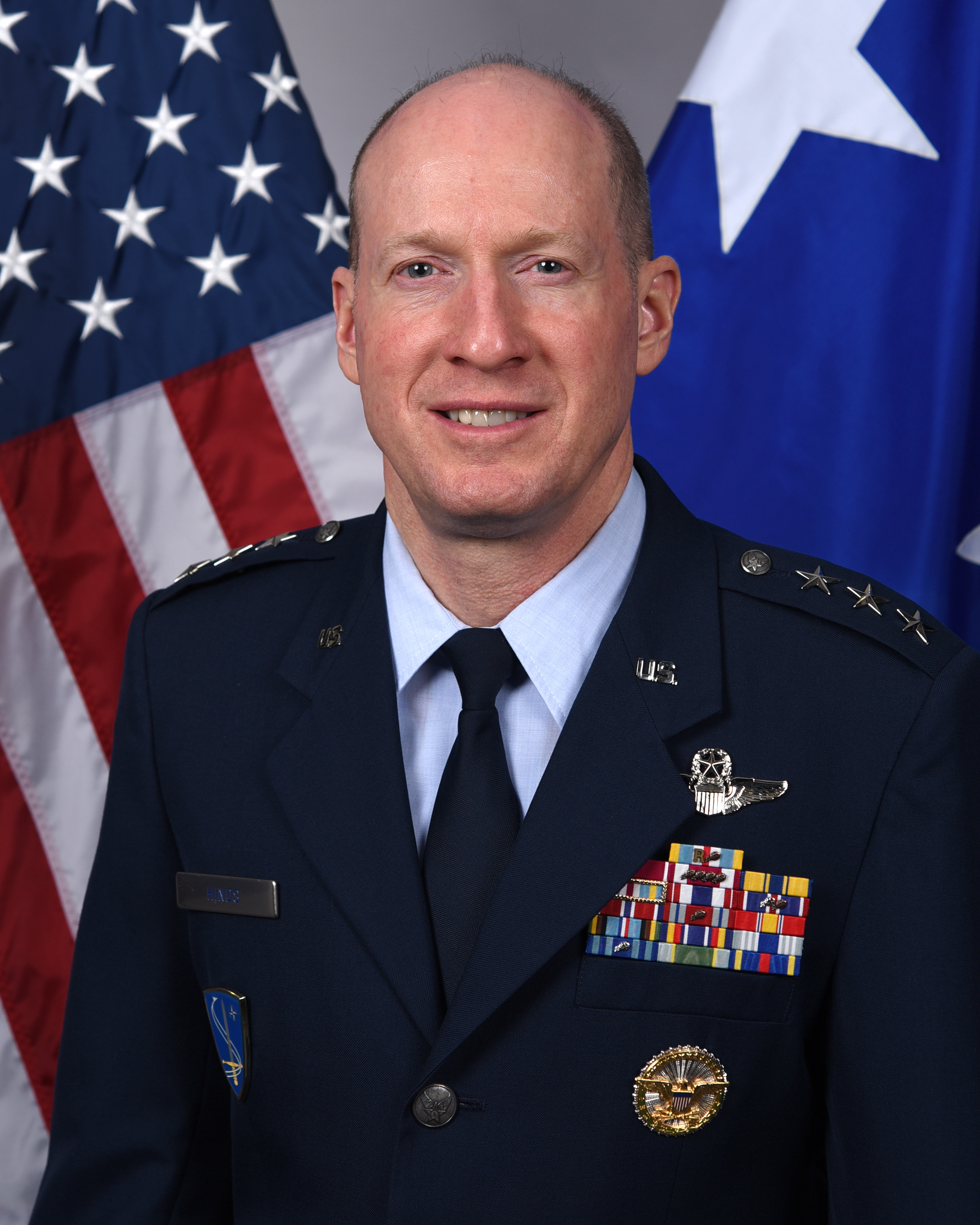
- Born: c. 1974 (age 51–52)
- Military career
- Allegiance: United States
- Branch: United States Air Force
- Service years: 1994–present
- Rank: Lieutenant General
- Commands: United States Air Forces in Europe – Air Forces Africa; Allied Air Command; 1st Fighter Wing; 94th Fighter Squadron
- Awards: Defense Superior Service Medal (2); Legion of Merit (2)

Jason T. Hinds (born c. 1974) is a United States Air Force lieutenant general who serves as the commander of United States Air Forces in Europe – Air Forces Africa. He previously served as the deputy commander of USAFE as well as director of operations of the United States European Command.

== Military career ==
Hinds has served as the director of plans, programs, and analyses of the United States Air Forces in Europe – Air Forces Africa.

In March 2023, Hinds was nominated for promotion to major general. His nomination was among the many general officer nominations held up by Senator Tommy Tuberville. In April 2024, he was nominated for promotion to lieutenant general and assignment as deputy commander of United States Air Forces in Europe – Air Forces Africa. Hinds was renominated to Lieutenant General on 29 September 2025.

Military offices
Preceded by Peter Fesler	Commander of the 1st Fighter Wing; 2017–2019	Succeeded by David R. Lopez
Preceded by Thomas B. Palenske	Senior Military Assistant to the Under Secretary of the Air Force; 2019–2020	Succeeded by Andrew M. Clark
Preceded by Edward T. Spinelli	Deputy Director of Operations, Strategic Deterrence, and Nuclear Integration of the United States Air Forces in Europe – Air Forces Africa; 2020–2021	Succeeded by William L. Marshall
Preceded by Adrian Spain	Director of Plans, Programs, and Analyses of the United States Air Forces in Europe – Air Forces Africa; 2021–2023	Succeeded by M. Scott Rowe
Preceded by Peter B. Andrysiak Jr.	Director of Operations of the United States European Command; 2023–2024	Succeeded by Daniel T. Lasica
Preceded by John Lamontagne	Deputy Commander of the United States Air Forces in Europe – Air Forces Africa; 2024–present	Incumbent
