= Peter Fesler =

U.S. Air Force general

Peter M. Fesler
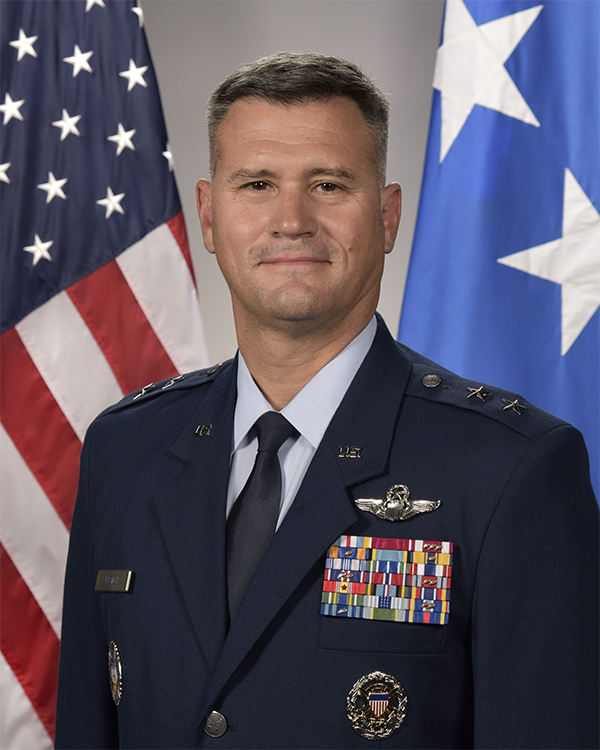
- Military career
- Allegiance: United States
- Branch: United States Air Force
- Service years: 1994–2021
- Rank: Major General
- Commands: 1st Fighter Wing; 27th Fighter Squadron
- Awards: Defense Superior Service Medal; Legion of Merit

Peter M. Fesler is a retired United States Air Force major general who served as the deputy director of operations of the North American Aerospace Defense Command from July 2018 to August 2021.

Fesler retired effective 1 November 2021.

Military offices
| Preceded by Kevin Huyck | Commander of the 1st Fighter Wing; 2014–2016 | Succeeded by Jason T. Hinds |
| Preceded by Jeremy T. Sloane | Vice Director of Operations of the North American Aerospace Defense Command; 2016–2018 | Succeeded by David S. Eaglin |
| Preceded by Kevin Huyck | Deputy Director of Operations of the North American Aerospace Defense Command; 2018–2021 | Succeeded by Paul J. Murray |
