= 1st Fighter Wing =

United States Air Force flying unit

1st Fighter Wing

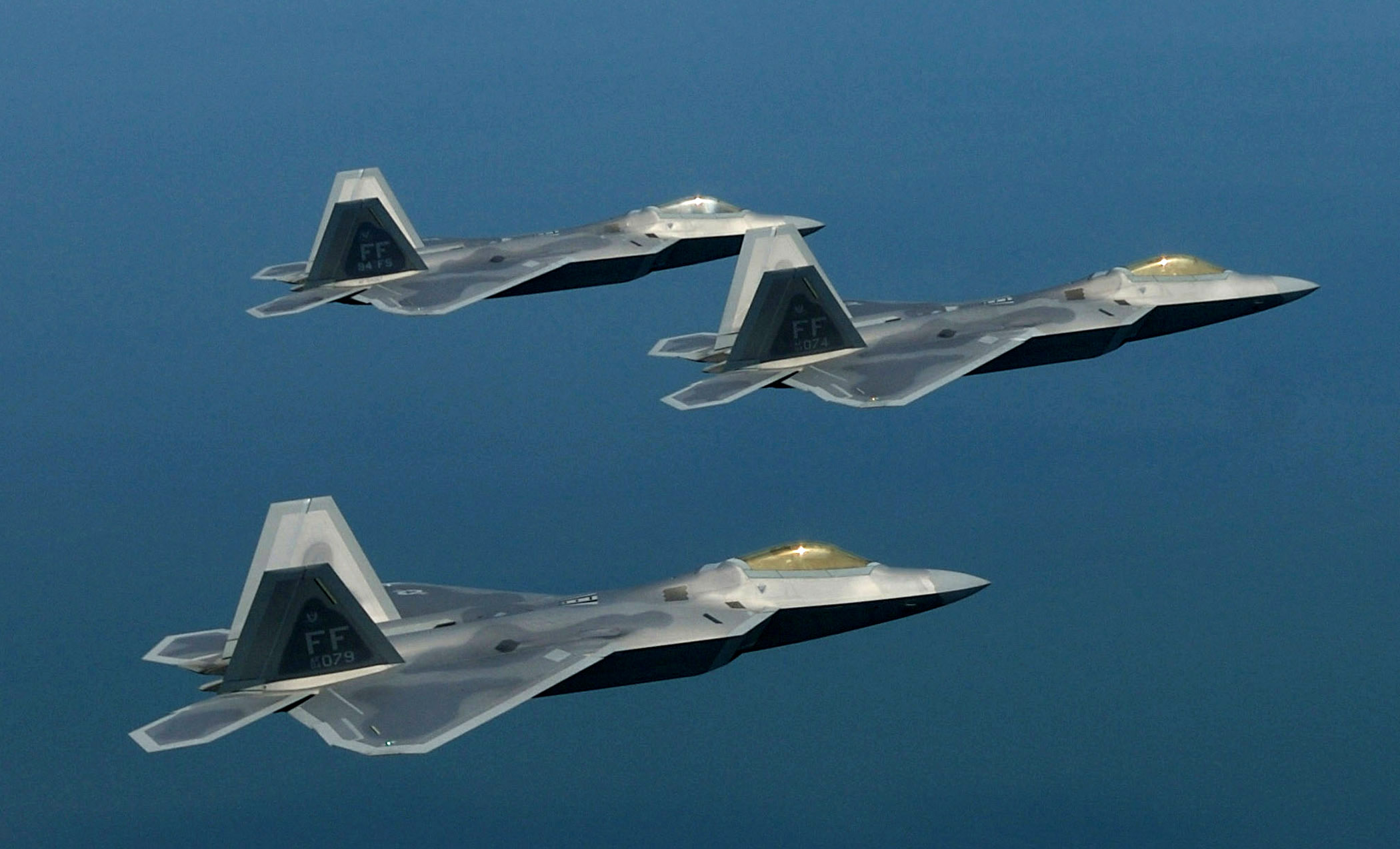
- Formation of 1st Fighter Wing F-22 Raptors
- Active: 1947–1952; 1956–present
- Country: United States
- Branch: United States Air Force
- Role: Fighter: air dominance
- Size: 36 Lockheed Martin F-22 Raptor
- Part of: Air Combat Command: Fifteenth Air Force
- Garrison/HQ: Langley Air Force Base, Virginia
- Mottos: Aut Vincere Aut Mori Latin "Conquer or Die"
- Engagements: World War I World War II; Persian Gulf War
- Decorations: Distinguished Unit Citation (3 awards) Air Force Outstanding Unit Award (6 awards)

Commanders
- Current commander: Colonel Brad S. Huebinger
- Deputy Commander: Colonel Marcus McGinn
- Command Chief: Command Chief Master Sergeant Michael J. Klebes
- Notable commanders: Larry D. Welch; Richard B. Myers; John T. Chain Jr. William R. Looney III; Gregory S. Martin

Insignia
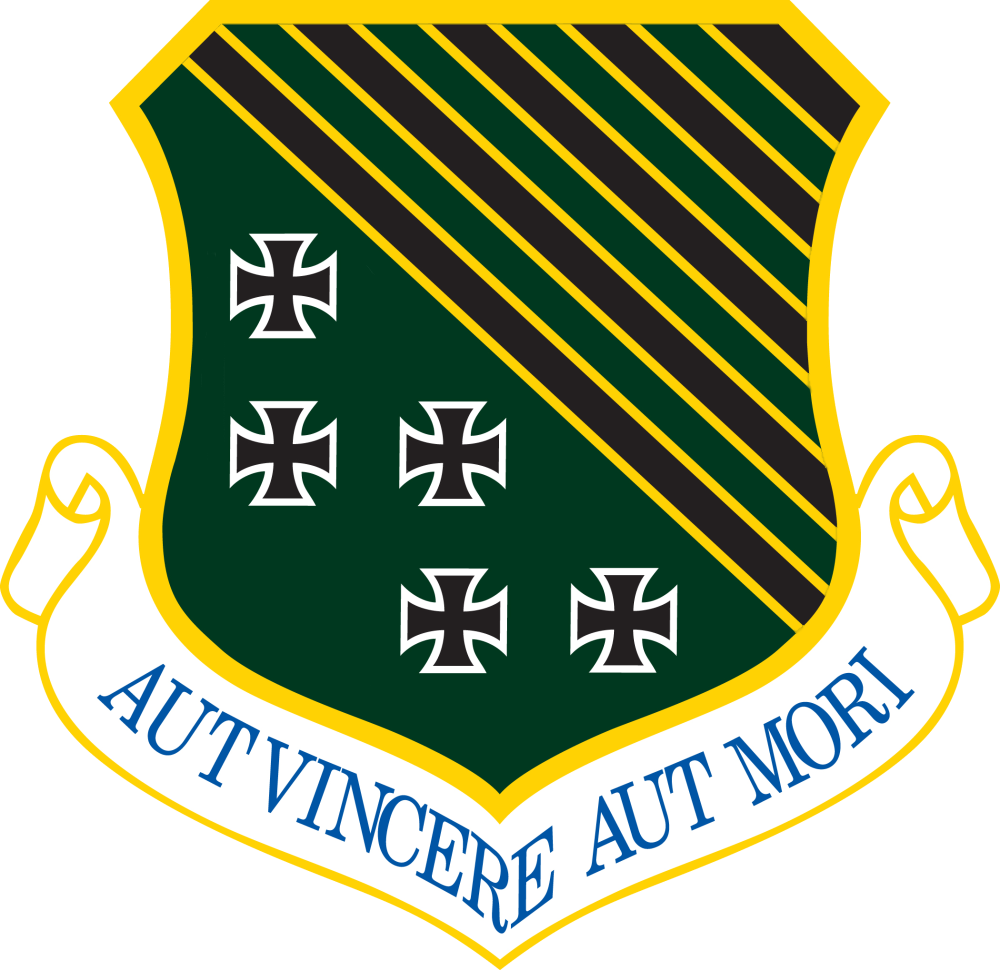
- 1st Fighter Wing emblem (Approved 22 May 1957)

The 1st Fighter Wing (1 FW) is a United States Air Force unit assigned to the Air Combat Command Fifteenth Air Force. It is stationed at Langley Air Force Base, VA. where it is a tenant unit, being supported by the 633d Air Base Wing.

Its 1st Operations Group (1 OG) is a successor organization of the 1st Fighter Group, one of the 15 original combat air groups formed by the Army before World War II. The 1 OG is the oldest major air combat unit in the United States Air Force, its origins formed on 5 May 1918.

The wing was initially part of Tactical Air Command being formed at March Field, California in 1947 and was one of the first wings to be equipped with the North American F-86 Sabre in February 1949. Briefly a part of Strategic Air Command in 1949, it was reassigned to Air Defense Command in 1950 and provided air defense of the Upper Midwest of the United States until being reassigned to Tactical Air Command in 1970. The 1 FW was the first operational wing equipped with the F-15A/B Eagle in 1976, and in 2005, was the first operational wing equipped with the Lockheed Martin F-22 Raptor air superiority fighter.

== History ==
For additional lineage and history, see 1st Fighter Group

=== Origins ===
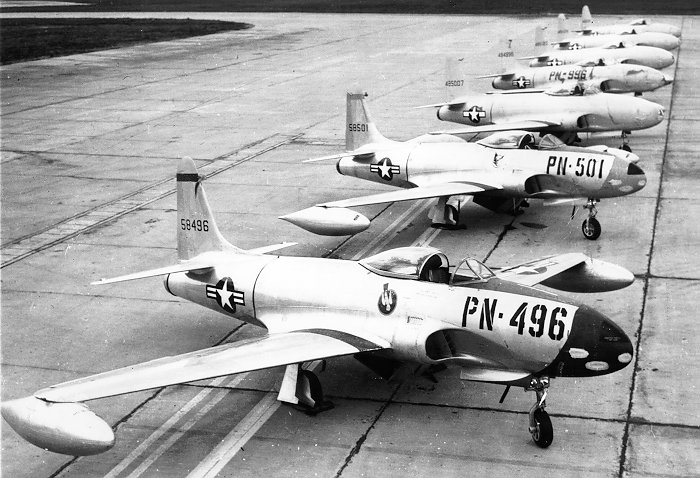
71st Fighter Squadron Lockheed P-80s at March AFB, CA, c. 1948.

The 1st Fighter Wing was activated at March Field California on 15 August 1947. It was assigned to Twelfth Air Force, Tactical Air Command (TAC).

In December 1948 Twelfth Air Force was assigned from Tactical Air Command to Continental Air Command (ConAC), established on 1 December 1948. ConAC assumed jurisdiction over both TAC and the Air Defense Command (ADC). This move reflected an effort to concentrate all fighter forces deployed within the continental United States to strengthen the air defense of the North American continent. The move was largely an administrative convenience: the units assigned to ConAC were dual-trained and expected to revert to their primary strategic or tactical roles after the air defense battle was won. The 1st Fighter Wing was subsequently transferred from Twelfth Air Force/TAC to Fourth Air Force/ConAC on 20 December 1948. Organizational and equipment changes continued throughout 1949. The first F-86 Sabre, assigned to the 94th Fighter Squadron, arrived on 15 February. By the end of June the wing had received seventy-nine of its eighty-three authorized F-86s. On 1 May the wing transferred from ConAC to Strategic Air Command (SAC) and the Fifteenth Air Force. The wing was subsequently attached to the 22d Bombardment Wing on 1 July.

At March, the wing trained in large formation flying and competed to establish various formation records. The 71st Fighter Squadron struck first in September 1949, when it launched a twelve and later an eighteen-aircraft formation. The 27th and the 94th countered on 21 October. On that day the 94th launched three thirteen-plane formations, but the 27th topped this with two twenty-one plane formations, The purpose of this exercise became clear in early January 1950, when the wing deployed a sizable contingent of aircraft to participate in the filming of the RKO film Jet Pilot. The group claimed a final formation record on 4 January when it passed a twenty-four plane formation (consisting of eight aircraft from each squadron) before the cameras. The group formed its own aerial demonstration team in January 1950. The team, dubbed the "Sabre Dancers", was composed of five members of the 27th Fighter Squadron. The Sabre Dancers made what was probably their most widely viewed flight on 22 April 1950, when they performed before an Armed Forces Day audience at Eglin AFB, Florida, that included President Harry S. Truman, most of his Cabinet, and numerous other political leaders.

=== Air Defense Command ===
==== Korean War era ====
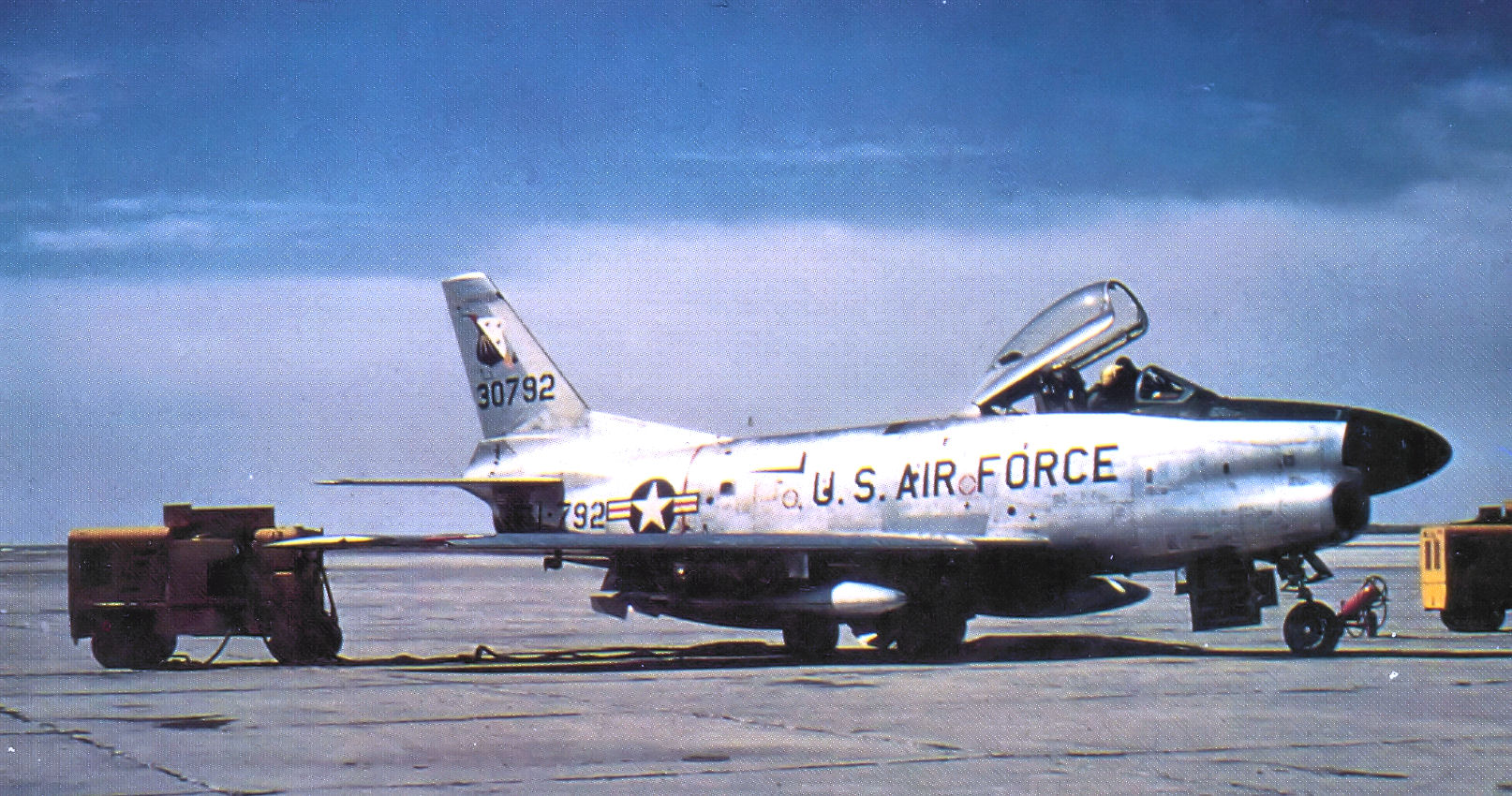
94th Fighter-Interceptor Squadron F-86D (Note: Aircraft is North American F-86D-60-NA Sabre serial 53–892. Taken near Selfridge Air Force Base, Michigan in 1955)

Effective 16 April 1950 the 1st Fighter Wing was redesignated the 1st Fighter-Interceptor Wing, the same designation that was simultaneously applied to the group and its three squadrons. The wing had, some days previously, been relieved from its attachment to the 22d Bombardment Wing. The organizational changes the wing had experienced since 1947 paled in comparison to the multitude of changes the unit underwent during the last six months of 1950. As of 30 June 1950, the 1st Fighter-Interceptor Group was assigned to the 1st Fighter-Interceptor Wing, which was itself assigned to Fifteenth Air Force and SAC. On 1 July the wing was relieved from assignment to Fifteenth Air Force and SAC and assigned to the Fourth Air Force and ConAC.

Two days later the wing issued orders establishing advanced parties of its headquarters and component organizations at Victorville (later George) AFB, California. On 22 July an advanced party of personnel from Headquarters, 1st Fighter-Interceptor Group and the 27th and 71st Fighter-Interceptor Squadrons departed for Griffiss AFB, New York. A letter directing the wing to send the group headquarters and the 27th and the 71st to Griffiss for attachment to the Eastern Air Defense Force (EADF), ConAC, arrived on 30 July. Headquarters, 1st Fighter-Interceptor Wing and the 94th Fighter-Interceptor Squadron were assigned to the Western Air Defense Force, ConAC, on 1 August, while the group headquarters and the 27th and 71st were attached to the EADF on 15 August. The wing was attached to the 27th Air Division, WADF, on 20 September. Finally, one month later, the 71st Fighter-Interceptor Squadron moved from Griffiss AFB to Pittsburgh International Airport, Pennsylvania.

As of 31 December 1950 Headquarters, 1st Fighter-Interceptor Wing and the 94th were stationed at George AFB, assigned to the WADF, and attached to the 27th Air Division. Headquarters, 1st Fighter-Interceptor Group, while still assigned to the wing, was stationed at Griffiss AFB with the 27th. The 71st was at Pittsburgh. The units on the East Coast were attached to the EADF.

Air Defense Command was reestablished as a major command on 1 January 1951, and the wing was assigned to ADC. In May, the 27th and the 71st were attached to the Connecticut Air National Guard 103d Fighter Interceptor Group, which provided administrative and logistical support and operational control, although the squadrons remained assigned to the 1st Fighter Group. Headquarters, 1st Fighter Group was relieved from attachment to the Eastern Air Defense Force and moved from Griffiss back to George without personnel or equipment. Meanwhile, at George AFB, the New Mexico Air National Guard 188th Fighter-Interceptor Squadron was attached to the 1st Fighter-Interceptor Wing, which provided administrative support and operational control.

All of these constant moves and reassignments as well as the fact that the wing headquarters stationed in California could provide only limited control and virtually no support to a group headquarters and squadrons deployed on the East Coast. While the policy of attaching units to higher headquarters established an ad hoc means of supplying the needed support, it was a cumbersome procedure that blurred organizational lines and did nothing for morale or unit cohesion above the squadron level. With the exception of the Headquarters and Headquarters Squadron, and the three fighter-interceptor squadrons, all 1st Fighter-Interceptor Wing organizations and the group headquarters were reduced to a strength of one officer and one enlisted man on 30 November 1951, at which time the wing moved from George Air Force Base, California, to Norton Air Force Base, California. The squadrons were reassigned to newly organized "defense wings": the 27th to the 4711th Air Defense Wing (ADW), Eastern Air Defense Force, the 71st to the 4708th Air Defense Wing, EADF, and the 94th to the 4705th Defense Wing, WADF. Headquarters, Air Defense Command inactivated the 1st Fighter-Interceptor Wing on 6 February 1952.

==== Selfridge AFB ====
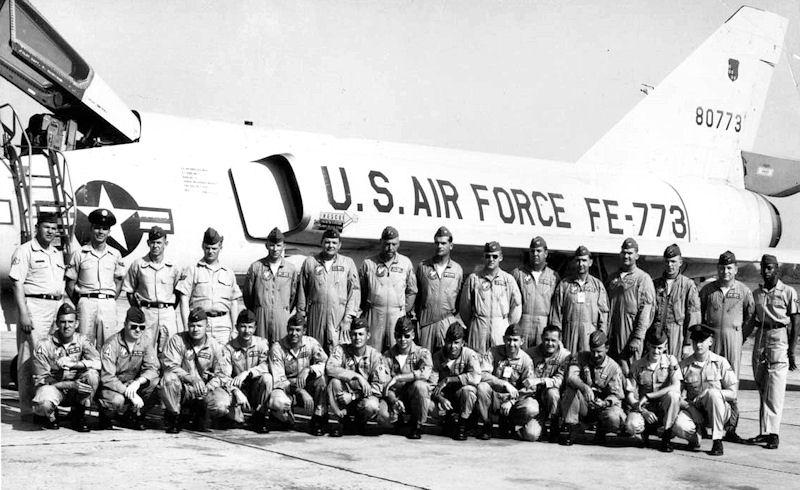
Squadron personnel of the 71st Fighter-Interceptor Squadron (Note: Taken about 1964. F-106 serial 58–773 is in the background.)

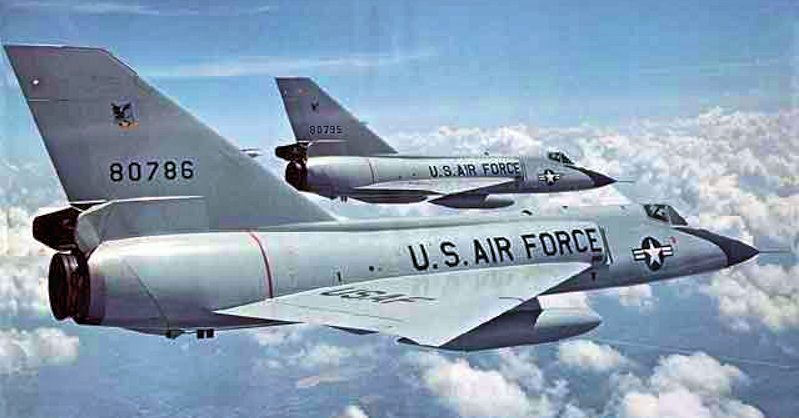
94th Fighter-Interceptor Squadron F-106 (Note: Aircraft is F-106A serial 58-0786. Taken near Selfridge AFB Michigan in 1965)

The organizational instability of the early 1950s was rooted in the demands of the Korean War. With the end of the war in Korea the Air Defense Command found itself in a position to return to a more traditional command structure. The 1st Fighter-Interceptor Wing was redesignated the 1st Fighter Wing (Air Defense) on 14 September 1956 and activated on 18 October 1956 at Selfridge AFB, Michigan. It was assigned to the Eastern Air Defense Force. After enduring a six-year period of frequent organizational changes, the wing began a period of stability. For approximately the next thirteen years it remained at Selfridge. Both the 71st and the 94th FIS traded their F-86s for F-102 Delta Dagger interceptors between 1958 and 1960. While the wing and its units operated from Selfridge AFB the 27th Fighter-Interceptor Squadron remained on the east coast. As of 31 December 1961 it was stationed at Dow AFB, Maine, and assigned to the Bangor Air Defense Sector, 26th Air Division. At that time the squadron was equipped with F-106 Delta Darts, and was not part of the 1st Fighter Wing.

In October 1962 the wing responded to the Cuban Missile Crisis by deploying aircraft, support personnel, equipment and supplies to Patrick Air Force Base, Florida, and Volk Field, Wisconsin. From 19 October through 27 November wing aircraft flew 620 sorties and 1,274 hours, most from Patrick AFB, while maintaining a mission-ready rate of approximately eighty percent. Wing life reverted to more normal training routines at year's end, and the pattern continued through 1963 and 1964.

On 15 March 1963 two Soviet bombers overflew Alaska and Alaskan Air Command F-102s were unable to intercept them. The response to this intrusion was to deploy ten F-106s from the 325th Fighter Wing to Alaska in what was called Operation White Shoes. While the 325th wing upgraded its F-106s, the 1st Fighter Wing relieved it from March to June 1964. While deployed in Alaska, two of the wing's F-106s were damaged in the Good Friday earthquake.

Beginning in about 1965 the wing began to transfer pilots to other units in or en route to South Vietnam. While the wing itself did not participate in the Vietnam War, its units were soon manned by personnel who had completed tours in Southeast Asia, with the 1st serving as a transition unit for many pilots en route to or returning from Southeast Asia.

Organizational changes continued to whittle away at the wing's strength in 1966 and 1967. The wing was assigned to the 34th Air Division, First Air Force, on 1 April 1966. This organization changed again on 16 January 1967, when the 71st Fighter-Interceptor Squadron, which had won top prize in the F-106 category at the 1965 William Tell weapons competition at Tyndall AFB, Florida, was transferred to the 328th Fighter Wing (Air Defense), Tenth Air Force, at Richards-Gebaur Air Force Base, Missouri. This reorganization left the 1st Fighter Wing with only one fighter squadron, the 94th. However, the reduced wing stayed busy. From 24 July through 4 August 1967 Selfridge became the hub of federal activities mobilized during the 1967 Detroit riots. Elements of the 3d Brigade, 82d Airborne Division and the 2d Brigade, 101st Airborne Division, a total of some 12,000 combat and support personnel, eventually passed through the base. From 1500 on 24 July to 1500 the next day, the base received 4,700 troops and 1,008 tons of cargo. On 1 August the base handled 363 C-130 Hercules sorties, 6,036 troops, and 2,492 tons of cargo. By the time the tactical command post at Selfridge was closed at 1130 on 4 August, the base had processed 1,389 C-130 sorties, 12,058 troops, and 4,735 tons of cargo.

In September 1968 the detached 71st Fighter-Interceptor Squadron was relieved from assignment to the 328th Fighter Wing, and transferred to the 28th Air Division, Tenth Air Force, at Malmstrom AFB, Montana, where it became a self-contained unit operating on the SAC base. Between 20 May and 5 November 1969, the 94th FIS deployed to Osan Air Base, Korea, for exercise College Cadence.

It was to be the 1st Fighter Wing's last major air defense effort. On 1 December 1969 the 94th was transferred to Wurtsmith AFB, Michigan, pending the inactivation of the 1st Fighter Wing, which was assigned to the 23d Air Division on that date. On 31 December 1969 the wing, with no units under its control, transferred to Hamilton AFB, California, and was assigned to the 26th Air Division. The wing's personnel and equipment were transferred to the 4708th Air Base Group, 23d Air Division, at Duluth International Airport, Minnesota, on 1 January 1970.

=== Tactical Air Command ===
On 1 August 1968, General William W. Momyer became commander of Tactical Air Command. While he devoted most of his attention to the pressing problems the command faced during the war in Vietnam, General Momyer also concerned himself with the designation of the units under his command. The movement of units to and from Vietnam left TAC with a mixed force. Some of its organizations had long and honorable tactical traditions. Others used a four-digit, command-controlled designations that gave them no history or traditions. General Momyer therefore directed the TAC planning staff to replace the four-digit designations with those of units that had a combat record dating from either World War II or Korea. He also directed the staff to "retain illustrious AFCON designators for the active tactical forces." This policy, plus the training demands caused by the war in Vietnam, led to the 1st Fighter Wing's return to Tactical Air Command in October 1970.

==== MacDill AFB ====
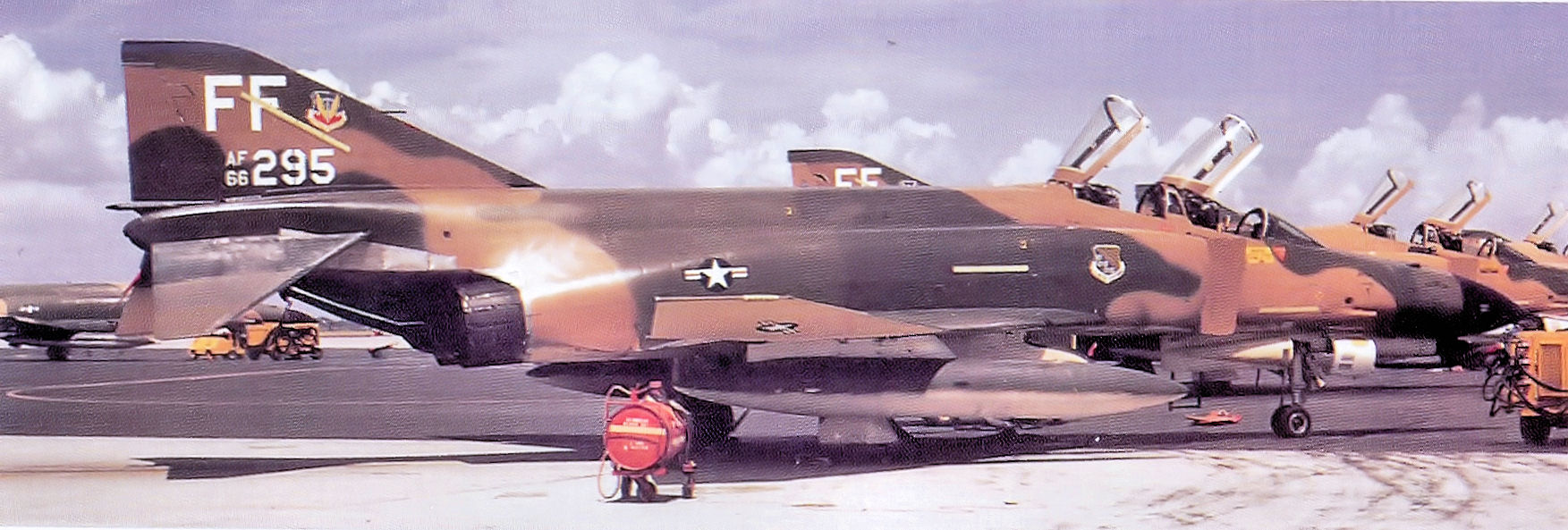
94th Tactical Fighter Squadron McDonnell F-4E (Note: Taken ar MacDill AFB in August 1972. Aircraft in foreground is McDonnell F-4E-31-MC Phantom II, serial 66–295.)

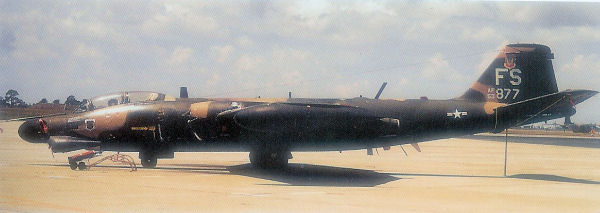
4530 CCTS B-57G (Note: Aircraft is Martin B-57G-MA, serial 53-3877.)

Headquarters, United States Air Force authorized the reassignment of the 1st Fighter Wing (Air Defense) from Aerospace Defense Command to Tactical Air Command on 30 July 1970. Three days later, HQ ADC directed the commander of the 26th Air Division to move Headquarters, 1st Fighter Wing (Air Defense) from Hamilton AFB, California, to MacDill AFB, Florida. All units moved without personnel or equipment. The personnel and equipment formerly of the 15th Tactical Fighter wing were reassigned to the 1st TFW. The squadrons of the 15 TFW were assigned to the historic wing: the 45th, 46th, and 47th Tactical Fighter Squadrons. Another organizational change effective 1 July 1971 transferred the wing from the 836th Air Division, inactivated on that date, to Ninth Air Force.

Completing the Wing's historic preservation, the commanders of the three squadrons participated in a shoot-out at the Avon Park Air Force Range to determine which squadrons would receive the designations of the 27th, 71st, and 94th. The commander of the 47 TFS marked the highest score, and chose the 94 TFS; the 46 TFS placed second, choosing the 27 TFS, leaving the 45 TFS with the squadron having the shortest history, the 71 TFS.

The wing spent the next four years providing advanced tactical training to F-4 Phantom II and B-57 Canberra aircrews, most of whom later saw service in the Vietnam War. On 1 October 1971, HQ TAC inactivated the 4530th Tactical Training Squadron, which, in addition to other duties, had trained Australian F-4 aircrew members and maintenance personnel during project Peace Reef. The 4501st Tactical Fighter Replacement Squadron, equipped with F-4s, assumed the 4530th's place in the wing's structure on the same date. The command inactivated the 4424th Combat Crew Training Squadron, the wing's B-57 training unit, on 30 June 1972, leaving the wing with four flying squadrons. All conducted advanced F-4 tactical training.

On 14 March 1974, the Air Force publicly announced plans to station the Air Force's first operational F-15 wing at Langley Air Force Base, Virginia. Langley was chosen due to its heritage and ideal location for TAC's secondary air defense mission. After studying the heritage of its wings, TAC selected the 1st Fighter Wing as the unit to receive the first Eagle. On 6 June 1975, Tactical Air Command directed Ninth Air Force to move the 1st Fighter Wing from MacDill to Langley AFB. Although the designation of the unit moved, the majority of MacDill personnel remained in place, and served under the newly designated 56th Tactical Fighter Wing which continued to conduct F-4 training.

==== Langley AFB ====
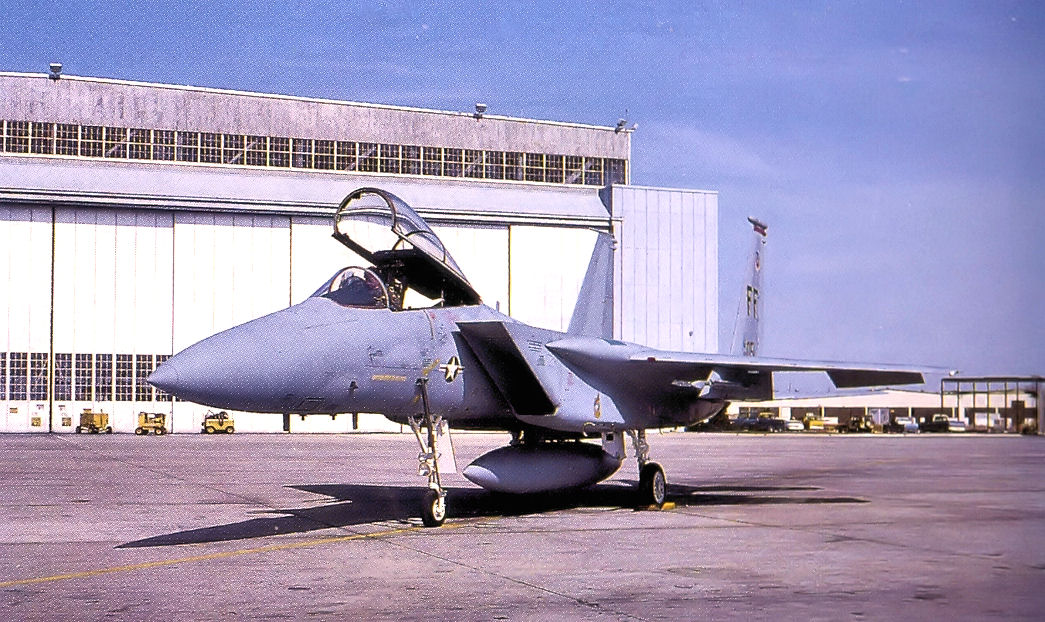
First F-15A arrives at Langley AFB, January 1976

1st Tactical Fighter Wing personnel spent six months preparing for the arrival of the F-15. By the end of 1975, the Wing was ready for its new air superiority weapon, and on 18 December 1975, Lt Col John Britt, Operations Officer, flew the Wing's first F-15B (a two-seat trainer) into Langley. Official welcoming ceremonies were held on 9 January 1976, when Lt Col Richard L. Craft, 27th Fighter Squadron Commander, landed with the Wing's first single seat F-15A. In recognition of its accomplishment of introducing the F-15 into the Air Force's operational inventory, the 1st Tactical Fighter Wing received its first Air Force Outstanding Unit Award, for the period 1 July 1975 – 31 October 1976.

After achieving operational ready status, the Wing took the experience they had earned and utilized it on a program nicknamed "Ready Eagle." The 1st helped prepare the 36th Tactical Fighter Wing at Bitburg Air Base, Germany, for their reception of the F-15. The 1st assisted in the training of maintenance personnel and pilots. By 23 September 1977, the wing provided Bitburg with 88 operationally ready pilots, 522 maintenance specialists, and later trained an additional 1,100 maintenance personnel at Bitburg.

On 15 April 1977, the 1 TFW acquired a new mission. The wing assumed responsibility for the 6th Airborne Command and Control Squadron's EC-135 aircraft and crews, previously assigned to the 4500th Air Base Wing at Langley. The 6 ACCS flew EC-135 airborne command posts in support of U.S. Commander in Chief, Atlantic Command (USCINCLANT) with deployments throughout the Atlantic region until early 1992. 1st Fighter Wing participation in worldwide deployments and training exercises continued through the 1980s. The Wing served in countries throughout Europe, Asia, the Middle East, Africa, and Central America.

The final F-15s left the 1st Fighter Wing on 3 September 2010, after operating the weapon system for nearly 35 years.

==== Southwest Asia operations ====
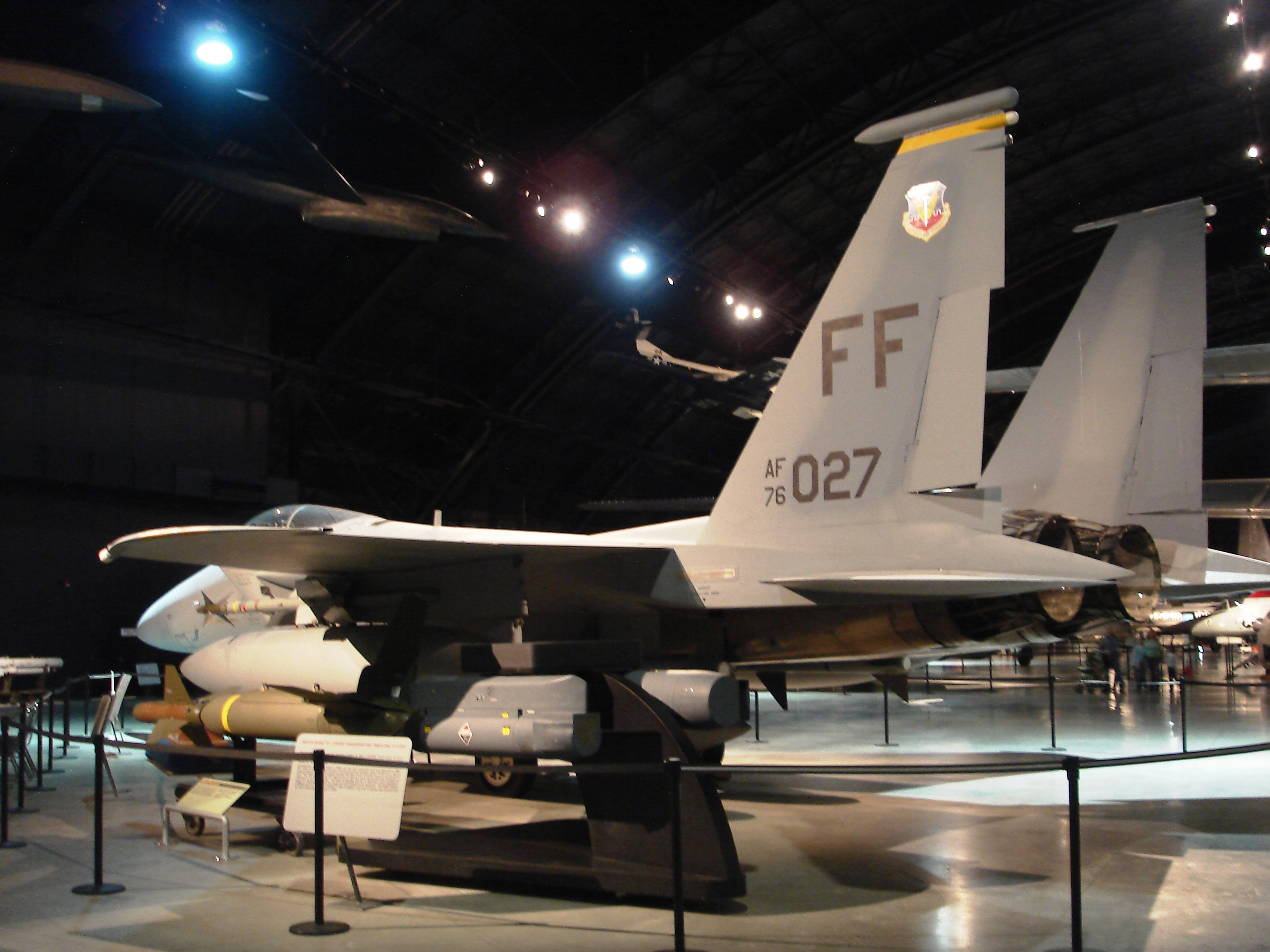
1st TFW F-15 Eagle on display at the National Museum of the United States Air Force.

The training and experience gained was called upon in the summer of 1990, when Iraqi forces invaded Kuwait. On 7 August 1990, the 27th and 71st Tactical Fighter Squadrons began deploying to Saudi Arabia as the first American combat units on the ground in Saudi Arabia, in support of the defense of the Arabian peninsula from further Iraqi aggression—an operation dubbed Operation Desert Shield. In all, the 1 TFW deployed 48 aircraft to the Persian Gulf. By 16 January 1991, when Desert Shield came to a close, the Wing amassed 4,207 sorties patrolling the Kuwait and Iraq border areas.

At 0115 local Saudi Arabia time, on 17 January 1991, sixteen 1st Tactical Fighter Wing F-15s departed King Abdul-Aziz Air Base and flew toward Iraq to participate in Operation Desert Storm, the liberation of Kuwait from the Iraqis.

During the first night of the operation, Captain Steven W. Tate of the 71st Tactical Fighter Squadron, shot down an Iraqi Mirage F-1, which turned out to be the wing's only kill during the war. It was also the first combat credit awarded to the wing under command of the U.S. Air Force. Upon its return on 8 March 1991, the 1st Tactical Fighter Wing had amassed a total of 2,564 sorties during Operation Desert Storm.

The end of the First Gulf War did not bring an end to the Wing's support in Southwest Asia. Monitoring the southern no-fly zone, the 1st provided six-month coverage every year under Operation Southern Watch and Operation Northern Watch. In October 1994, when Saddam Hussein again placed forces near the Kuwaiti border, the Wing participated in a short-notice deployment, Operation Vigilant Warrior.

Operation Vigilant Warrior demonstrated the need for an Air Force capability of providing combat air power globally at short notice. This requirement resulted in the concept of the Air Expeditionary Force (AEF.) During AEF II, the 1st Fighter Wing deployed 12 F-15s and over 600 personnel to Shaheed Mwaffaq Air Base, Jordan, from 12 April – 28 June 1996. Wing members built and operated from the bare base, and provided support to Operation Southern Watch, supporting UN sanctions and enforcing the no-fly zones in Iraq.

On 25 June 1996, a fuel truck loaded with explosives detonated outside the Khobar Towers Housing area, in Dhahran, Saudi Arabia. The bomb killed 19 Air Force members, including five airmen of the 71st Rescue Squadron, and consequently the 1st Fighter Wing relocated its Southwest Asia operations from Dhahran to Prince Sultan Air Base, Al Kharj.

=== From 1991 ===
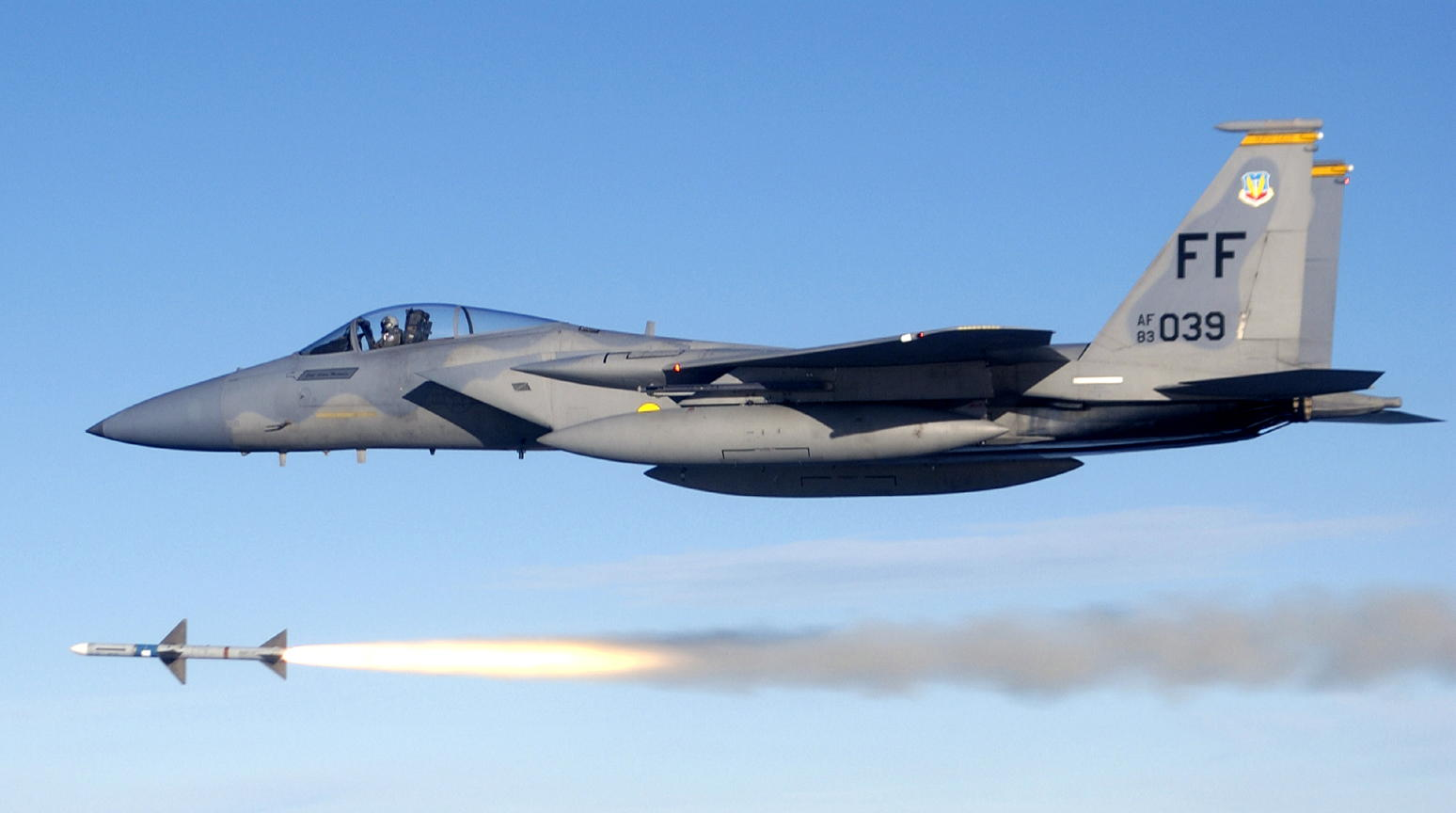
27th Fighter Squadron F-15C firing an AIM-7M Sparrow missile.

On 1 October 1991, the 1st Tactical Fighter Wing was redesignated 1st Fighter Wing; the 1st Fighter Group was redesignated as the 1st Operations Group and reactivated as part of the wing. The 1st Fighter Wing assumed responsibility of three additional missions—air control, airlift, and search and rescue:

—On 15 March 1992, the 74th Air Control Squadron was transferred to the 1st Fighter Wing. The 74th provided command and control of air operations for worldwide operations.
—On 1 February 1993, the 41st and 71st Rescue Squadrons, and the 741st Maintenance Squadron were assigned to the 1st Fighter Wing. Stationed at Patrick AFB, Fla., the units provided search and rescue for NASA's space shuttle missions, and support of combat search and rescue operations in Southwest Asia. Additionally,
—On 1 April 1993 C-21 operational support aircraft were assigned to the Wing with the establishment of Detachment 1, 1 OG. On 1 May, the detachment inactivated and the 12th Airlift Flight, with the same mission, activated.

The 1st Rescue Group was activated as part of the 1st Fighter Wing on 14 June 1995, to provide operational control of the Search and Rescue mission.

Two realignments ordered by Air Combat Command took effect on the same day, 1 April 1997. The most substantial one had been the 1st Rescue Group's reassignment to the 347th Wing at Moody Air Force Base. This move meant the loss of two types of aircraft, the HC-130P "Hercules" gunship, and the HH-60G "Pave Hawk" helicopter. When the Air Force decided to transfer 12th Airlift Flight to Air Mobility Command, another type of aircraft, the C-21, was removed from the 1st Fighter Wing's possession exactly four years after it had been assigned.

What made the wing's valued participation in this contingency unique is the fact it sent no aircraft in support of it, exemplifying the diversity of the 1st Fighter Wing's comprehensive mission. More than 150 personnel from 11 units within the 1st Fighter Wing deployed to the European theater in direct support of Operation Allied Force and associated operations such as Noble Anvil and Shining Hope.

Responsible for the worldwide mobility commitment to execute command and control operations, the 74th Air Control Squadron provided the largest contingent of 1st Fighter Wing personnel and equipment to Operation Noble Anvil. The 74th ACS set up their equipment outside Budapest, Hungary, to provide joint forces and theater commanders with an accurate air picture for conducting offensive and defensive missions. During Operation Allied Force, the 74th Air Control Squadron deployed to provide critical air control in the European Theater of Operations.

==== After September 11 terrorist attacks ====
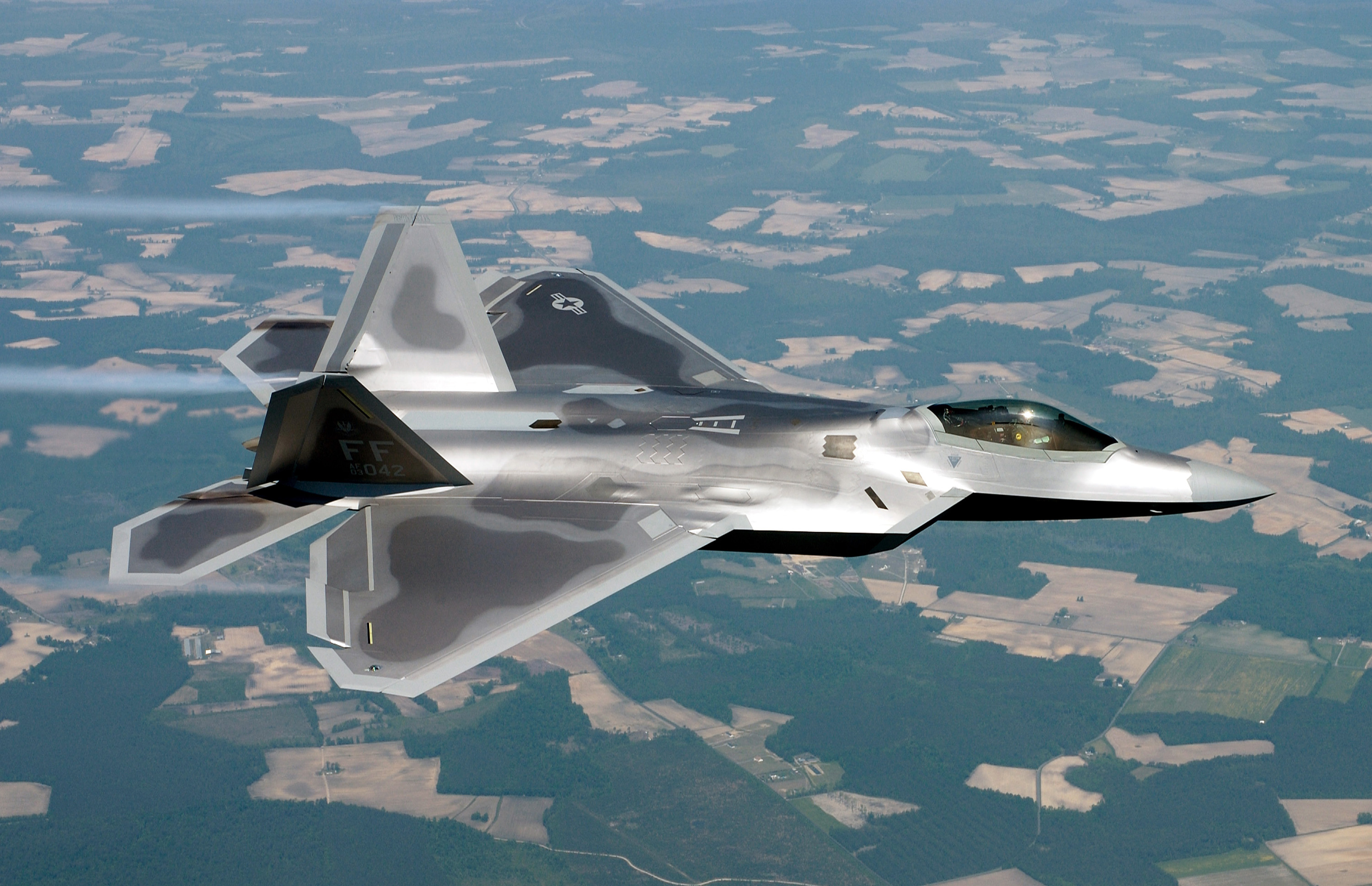
F-22A of the 27th Fighter Squadron (Note: Taken at Langley Air Force Base, Virginia, 2005. The 27th was the first squadron to receive the F-22A.)

After the September 11 attacks in 2001, the 1st Fighter Wing took to the skies to simultaneously defend the east and west coasts of the US against further terrorist attacks. The wing's F-15s were among the first fighters on scene over Washington, D.C., and remained on station continuously for the next six months. The 1st Fighter Wing simultaneously participated in the US homeland defense mission in Operation Noble Eagle; maintained its lead wing status in the USAF's Air Expeditionary Force rotations to Southwest Asia and Turkey, enforcing no-fly zones in Operation Southern Watch/Operation Northern Watch until 2003; and deployed fighters to Keflavík, Iceland to fulfill NATO treaty obligations.

During the first stages of the Iraq War in 2003, the 71st Fighter Squadron deployed again to Southwest Asia. In 2005, the 27th and 94th Fighter Squadrons became the first squadrons in the world to achieve operational status flying the F-22 Raptor.

==== Joint basing ====
The 1st Fighter Wing served as the host unit of Langley AFB from 1975 until 7 January 2010. The wing relinquished two of its four groups to the newly reactivated 633d Air Base Wing, which assumed host duties for Langley AFB. The change of command also was a pivotal step in the realignment consolidation of Langley AFB and Fort Eustis into Joint Base Langley-Eustis, which stood up in January 2010.

==== 2023 Chinese balloon incident ====
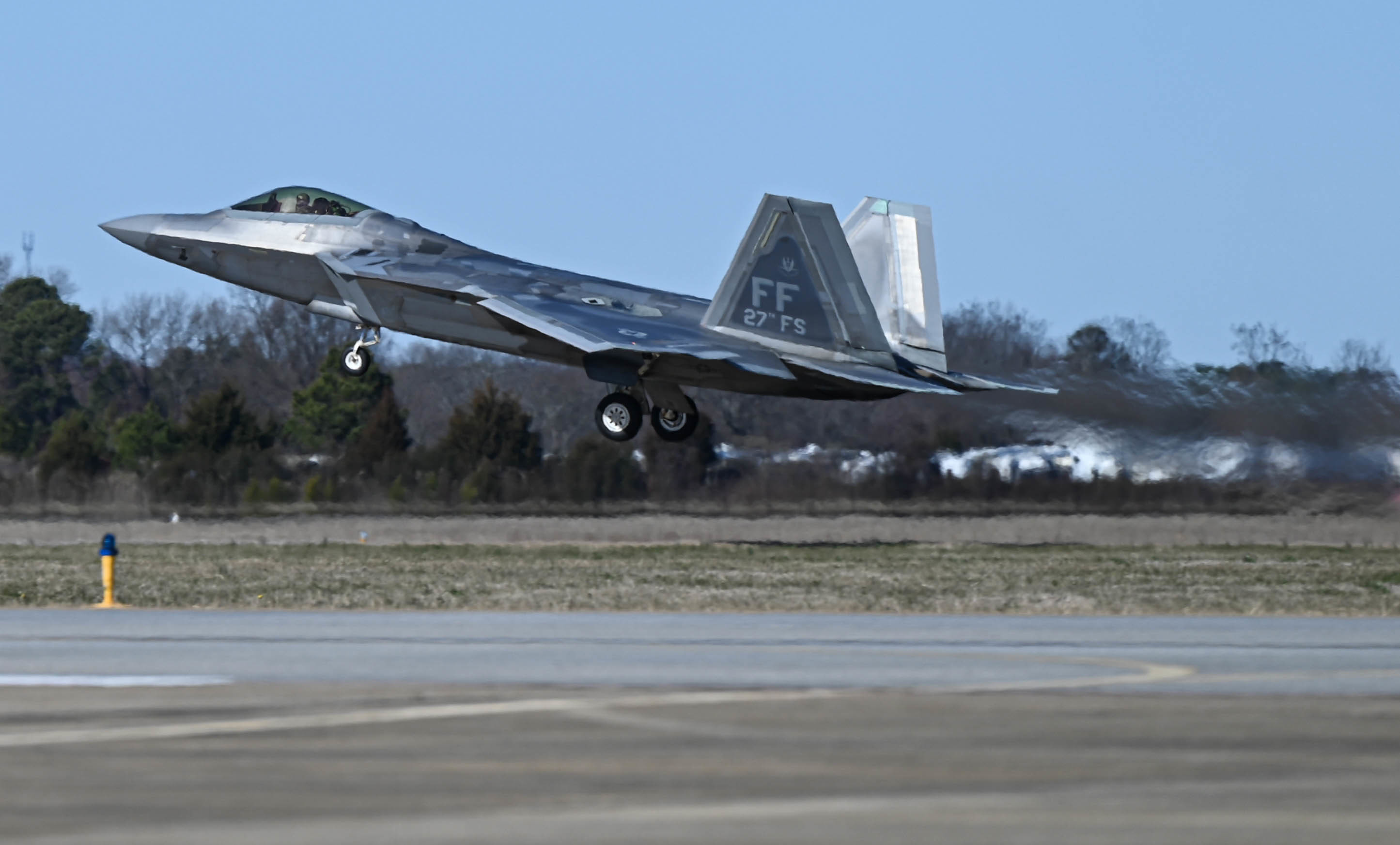
An F-22 Raptor of the 27th Fighter Squadron takes off from Joint Base Langley-Eustis during the 2023 Chinese balloon incident

On 4 February 2023, F-22s of the 1st Fighter Wing were dispatched from Langley AFB to shadow an alleged Chinese spy balloon that had been floating southeastward over the continental United States for several days. Once the balloon floated over the Atlantic Ocean near South Carolina, one of the F-22s fired a single AIM-9X Sidewinder air-to-air missile at the balloon from an altitude of 58,000 feet, downing it. The wreckage landed approximately 6 miles offshore and was subsequently secured by ships of the US Navy and US Coast Guard. The downing of the balloon marked the first air-to-air kill made by an F-22. During this mission, the F-22s of the 1st Fighter Wing were assisted by F-15s from the 104th Fighter Wing of the Massachusetts Air National Guard, as well as tanker aircraft from various other units of the United States Air Force, including the 916th Air Refueling Wing of Seymour Johnson Air Force Base.

== Lineage, assignments ==
- Designated as: 1st Fighter Wing on 28 July 1947

Organized on: 15 August 1947
Redesignated as: 1st Fighter-Interceptor Wing on 16 April 1950
Inactivated on: 6 February 1952

- Redesignated as: 1st Fighter Wing (Air Defense), 14 September 1956

Activated on: 18 October 1956
Redesignated as: 1st Tactical Fighter Wing on 1 October 1970
Redesignated as: 1st Fighter Wing on 1 October 1991

=== Assignments ===
- Twelfth Air Force, 15 August 1947
- Fourth Air Force, 20 December 1948
- Fifteenth Air Force, 1 May 1949

Attached to: 67th Tactical Reconnaissance Wing, 25 November 1947 – 28 March 1949
Attached to: 22d Bombardment Wing, 10 May 1949 – 1 April 1950

- Fourth Air Force, 1 July 1950

Attached to Western Air Defense Force, 1–31 July 1950)

- Western Air Defense Force, 1 August 1950 – 6 February 1952

Attached to: Southern California Air Defense Sector [Provisional], 7 August – 19 September 1950
Attached to: 27th Air Division, 20 September 1950 – c. 6 February 1952)

- 30th Air Division, 18 October 1956
- Detroit Air Defense Sector, 1 April 1959
- 34th Air Division, 1 April 1966
- 23rd Air Division, 1 December 1969
- 26th Air Division, 31 December 1969
- 836th Air Division, 1 October 1970
- Ninth Air Force, 30 September 1971 – 20 August 2020
- Fifteenth Air Force, 20 August 2020 – present

=== Flying components ===
Groups

- 1st Fighter Group (later, 1st Fighter-Interceptor Group; 1st Fighter; 1st Operations Group): 15 August 1947 – 6 February 1952 (detached 15 August 1950 – 3 June 1951); 18 October 1956 – 1 February 1961; 1 October 1991–.
- 1st Airdrome Group (later 1st Air Base Group, 1st Combat Support Group, 1st Support Group, 1st Mission Support Group): 15 August 1957 – 6 February 1952; 18 October 1956 – 30 June 1975, 15 April 1977 – 7 January 2010
- 1st Maintenance & Supply Group (later 1st Logistics Group, 1st Maintenance Group): 15 August 1947 – 6 February 1952; 18 October 1956 – 1 February 1961; 1 October 1991–.
- 1st Medical Group (earlier USAF Hospital, Langley, USAF Regional Hospital, Langley): 15 April 1977 – present
- 1st Rescue Group: 14 June 1995 – 1 April 1997.
- 1st Station Medical Group (later 1st Medical Group, 1st USAF Hospital, 1st Tactical Hospital): 15 August 1947 – 6 February 1952, 18 October 1956 – 1 May 1973, 1 February 1978 – 15 March 1987
- 67th Reconnaissance Group: 15 August – 25 November 1947

Squadrons

- 6th Airborne Command and Control Squadron: 19 April 1976 – 1 October 1991 (1992?)
- 7th Liaison Squadron: 1 September 1947 – 28 March 1949.
- 27th Tactical Fighter Squadron: 1 July 1971 – 1 October 1991 (detached 7 August 1990 – 8 March 1991).
- 45th Tactical Fighter Squadron: 1 October 1970 – 1 July 1971.
- 46th Tactical Fighter Squadron: 1 October 1970 – 1 July 1971.
- 47th Tactical Fighter Squadron: 1 October 1970 – 1 July 1971.
- 71st Fighter-Interceptor Squadron (later, 71st Tactical Fighter, then 71st Fighter Squadron): 1 February 1961 – 16 January 1967; 1 July 1971 – 1 October 1991 (detached 7 August 1990 – 8 March 1991).
- 84th Fighter-Interceptor Squadron: 31 December 1969 – 1 October 1970.
- 94th Fighter-Interceptor Squadron (later, 94th Tactical Fighter, then 94th Fighter Squadron): attached 15 August 1950 – 3 June 1951; assigned 1 February 1961 – 1 December 1969 (detached 24 May – 3 November 1969); assigned 1 July 1971 – 1 October 1991.
- 188th Fighter-Interceptor Squadron: attached 15 June 1951 – 6 February 1952.
- 4424th Combat Crew Training Squadron: 1 October 1970 – 30 June 1972.
- 4501st Tactical Fighter Replacement Squadron: 1 October 1971 – 30 June 1975.

Flights

- 4401st Helicopter Flight: 31 March 1987 – 1 October 1991.

=== Stations ===
- March Field (later, AFB), California, 15 August 1947
- George AFB, California, 18 July 1950
- Norton AFB, California, 1 December 1951 – 6 February 1952
- Selfridge AFB, Michigan, 18 October 1956
- Hamilton AFB, California, 31 December 1969
- MacDill AFB, Florida, 1 October 1970
- Langley AFB, Virginia, 30 June 1975–.

Components of wing deployed to King Abdul Aziz Air Base, Saudi Arabia
1st Tactical Fighter Wing (Provisional)
(Operation Desert Storm/Desert Shield), August 1990 – March 1991

=== Aircraft ===
- Lockheed P-80 Shooting Star (later F-80) (1947–1949)
- FA (later, RB)-26 (1947–1949)
- Stinson L-13 (1947–1949)
- Martin B-26 Marauder (1948–1949)
- Piper L-4 Grasshopper (1948–1949)
- Stinson L-5 Sentinel (1948–1949)
- Boeing B-29 Superfortress (1949)
- North American P-51 Mustang (1951–1952)
- North American F-86 Sabre (1956–1960, 1949–1952)
- Convair F-102 Delta Dagger (1958–1960)
- Convair F-106 Delta Dart (1960–1969, 1969–1970)
- McDonnell Douglas F-4 Phantom II (1970–1990's)
- Martin B-57 Canberra (1970–1972)
- McDonnell Douglas F-15 Eagle (1976–present)
- Boeing EC-135 (1976–1992)
- Sikorsky HH-3 (1993–1994)
- Lockheed HC-130 (1993–present)
- Gates C-21 (1993–1997)
- Sikorsky HH-60 Pave Hawk (1994–1997)
- Lockheed Martin F-22 Raptor (2004–present)

=== Organization ===
The major units currently comprising the 1st Fighter Wing are as follows:

- Headquarters, First Fighter Wing
- 1st Operations Group
  - 27th Fighter Squadron
  - 71st Fighter Squadron
  - 94th Fighter Squadron
  - 1st Operations Support Squadron
- 1st Maintenance Group
  - 1st Maintenance Squadron
  - 1st Munitions Squadron

=== Commanders ===
- Col Carl J. Crane, 15 August 1947
- Col Elvin F. Maughn, 19 January 1948
- Col Clifford H. Rees, 17 May 1948
- Col Joseph H. Davidson, 13 January 1949
- Col George McCoy Jr., 14 June 1949
- Col William L. Lee, 19 August 1949
- Col Wiley D. Ganey, 4 January 1950
- Col George McCoy Jr., 17 February 1950
- Brig Gen Donald R. Hutchinson, c. 17 October 1950
- Col Dolf E. Muehleisen, 14 December 1950
- Col Robert F. Worley, c. June 1951 – 6 February 1952
- Col Glenn E. Duncan, 18 October 1956
- Col Charles D. Sonnkalb, c. August 1959
- Col George J. LaBreche, c. December 1960
- Col Ralph G. Taylor Jr., 15 June 1962
- Col Wallace B. Frank, 11 September 1963
- Col Converse B. Kelly, 16 September 1963
- Col Kenneth E. Rosebush, August 1966
- Col Taras T. Popovich, 29 April 1968
- Col Morris B. Pitts, c. 31 October 1969
- Col Mervin M. Taylor, January 1970
- Col Travis R. McNeil, 1 October 1970
- Col Robert F. Titus, 1 March 1971
- Col Howard W. Leaf, 6 May 1971
- Col Walter D. Druen Jr., 1 November 1971
- Col Sidney L. Davis, 18 April 1972
- Col Gerald J. Carey Jr., 25 June 1973
- Col Ernest A. Bedke, by June 1975
- Lt Col George H. Miller, 1 July 1975
- Brig Gen Larry D. Welch, 1 August 1975
- Brig Gen John T. Chain Jr., 1 August 1977
- Col Neil L. Eddins, 27 March 1978
- Col Donald L. Miller, 15 May 1979
- Brig Gen William T. Tolbert, 11 August 1980
- Brig Gen Eugene H. Fischer, 29 January 1982
- Brig Gen Henry Viccellio Jr., 6 April 1983
- Brig Gen Billy G. McCoy, 31 May 1985
- Col Buster C. Glosson, 10 July 1986
- Col Richard B. Myers, 11 June 1987
- Col John M. McBroom, 24 February 1989
- Col David J. McCloud, 27 June 1991
- Brig Gen Gregory S. Martin, 15 June 1993
- Brig Gen William R. Looney III, 23 May 1995
- Col Felix Dupre, 11 April 1996 (temporary)
- Brig Gen William R. Looney III, 29 June 1996
- Brig Gen Theodore W. Lay II, 10 July 1996
- Col Gary R. Dylewski, 21 October 1997
- Col Felix Dupre, 7 April 1999
- Brig Gen Stephen M. Goldfein, 10 April 2000
- Col Stephen J. Miller, 11 January 2002 – September 2003
- Col Frank Gorenc, September 2003 – June 2005
- Brig Gen Burton M. Field, June 2005 – April 2007
- Brig Gen Mark Barrett, April 2007 – May 2009
- Col Matthew H. Molloy, 8 May 2009 – 23 May 2011
- Col Kevin J. Robbins, 23 May 2011 – July 2013
- Col Kevin A. Huyck, July 2013 – 2015
- Col Peter Fesler, 2015 – 2017
- Col Jason T. Hinds, 2017–2019
- Col David R. Lopez, June 2019 –July 2021
- Col William Creeden, July 2021 – July 2023
- Col Brandon J. Tellez, 2023 – 2025
- Col Brad S. Huebinger, 6 June 2025 – Present

== Honors ==
Authorized to display honors earned by the 1st Operations Group prior to 15 August 1947.

Service Streamers. None.

Campaign Streamers.

World War I
Champagne-Marne; Aisne-Marne; Oise-Aisne; St Mihiel; Meuse-Argonne; Lorraine Defensive Sector; Champagne Defensive Sector.

World War II
Air Offensive, Europe; Algeria-French Morocco; Tunisia; Sicily; Naples-Foggia; Anzio; Rome-Arno; Normandy; Northern France; Southern France; North Apennines; Rhineland; Central Europe; Po Valley; Air Combat, EAME Theater. Decorations. Distinguished Unit Citations: Italy, 25 August 1943; Italy, 30 August 1943; Ploieşti, Romania, 18 May 1944.

Southwest Asia
Defense of Saudi Arabia; Liberation and Defense of Kuwait.

Decorations.

Air Force Outstanding Unit Awards
1 July 1975 – 31 October 1976; 15 June 1982 – 15 June 1984; 16 June 1984 – 15 June 1986; 1 June 1995 – 31 May 1997; 1 June 1998 – 31 May 2000; 1 June 2000 – 31 May 2001.

== Emblem ==
Approved for 1st Operations Group on 10 February 1924 and for 1st Fighter Wing on 22 May 1957. The five stripes stand for the original five squadrons, and the crosses represent the group's five campaigns during World War I.
