= John M. Wood (general) =

American Air Force general

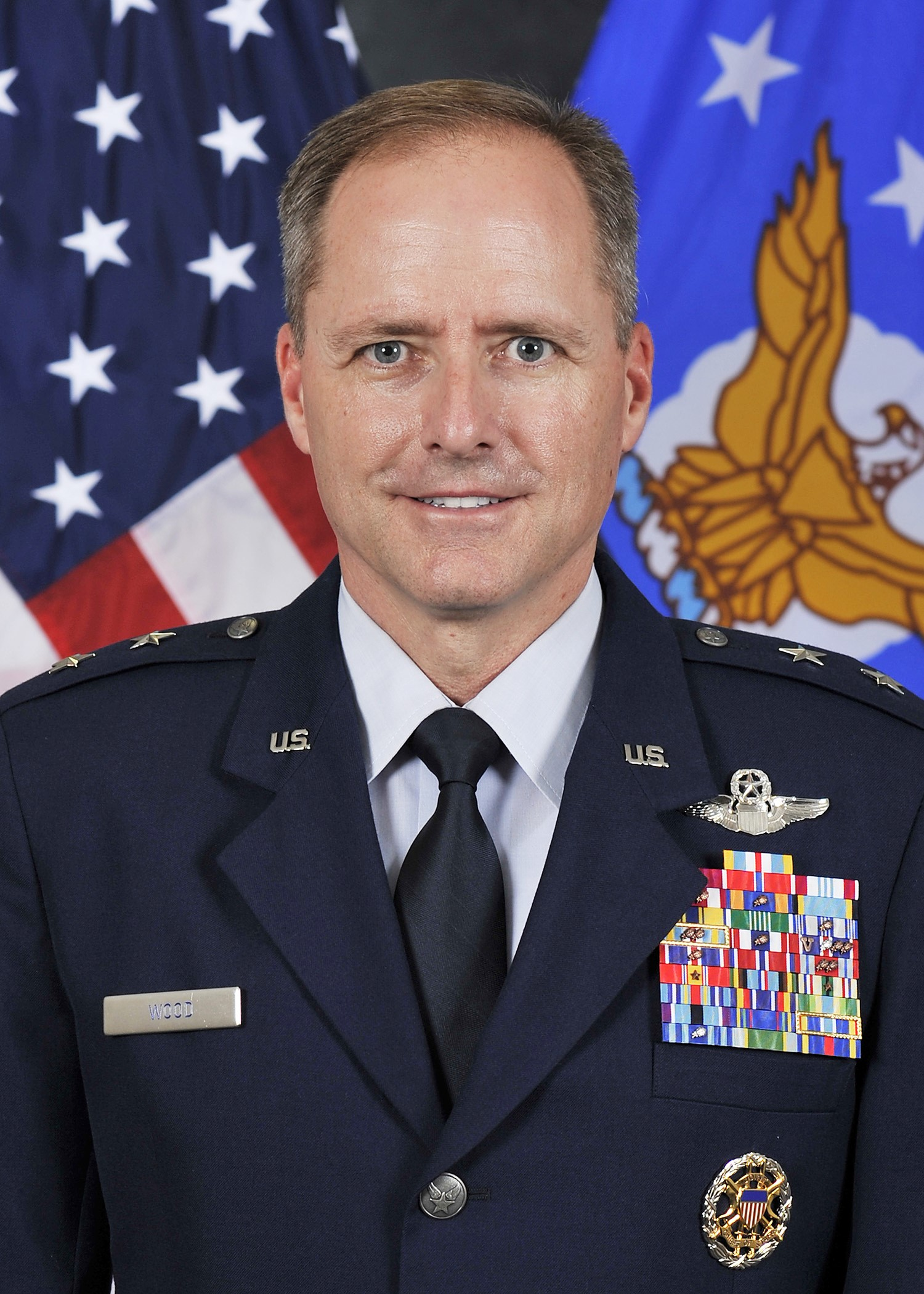
- Military career
- Allegiance: United States
- Branch: United States Air Force
- Service years: 1989–2021
- Rank: Major General
- Commands: Third Air Force; 87th Air Base Wing; 437th Airlift Wing; 32nd Air Refueling Squadron
- Awards: Defense Superior Service Medal; Legion of Merit; Bronze Star Medal

John M. Wood is a retired major general in the United States Air Force. He commanded the Third Air Force at Ramstein Air Base from 2018 until 2020. He has over 4,000 flight hours.

== Air Force career ==
John Wood graduated with a degree in aeronautical engineering from the University of California, Davis, and commissioned into the United States Air Force in 1989. He attended pilot training at Vance AFB, and remained as a T-38 Talon instructor pilot. He later flew the C-130 Hercules at Dyess AFB, and the KC-10 Extender at Travis AFB. He commanded the 32nd Air Refueling Squadron, the 437th Airlift Wing, and the 87th Air Base Wing. In 2018, he assumed command of the Third Air Force from Lieutenant General Richard M. Clark. On June 24, 2020, he relinquished command to Major General Randall Reed, and became the Director of Strategy, Engagement, and Programs for United States Africa Command until July 2021.

== Effective dates of promotion ==
Insignia	Rank	Date
	Major general	August 2, 2017
	Brigadier general	December 31, 2013
	Colonel	September 1, 2007
	Lieutenant colonel	April 1, 2004
	Major	May 1, 2000
	Captain	July 25, 1993
	First lieutenant	July 25, 1991
	Second lieutenant	April 1, 1989

Military offices
Preceded by John Millander	Commander of the 437th Airlift Wing; 2009–2011	Succeeded by Erik Hansen
Preceded by Gina Grosso	Commander of Joint Base McGuire–Dix–Lakehurst and the 87th Air Base Wing; 2011–2013	Succeeded by James C. Hodges
Preceded by ???	Deputy Director of Strategic Plans, Requirements, and Programs of the Air Mobility Command; 2013–2015	Succeeded by Randall Reed
Preceded by Jacqueline Van Ovost	Deputy Director for Politico-Military Affairs (Europe, NATO, Russia) of the Joint Staff; 2015–2017	Succeeded by Michael Tarsa
Preceded by Jon T. Thomas	Director of Strategic Plans, Requirements and Programs of the Air Mobility Command; 2017–2018	Succeeded by Mark Camerer
Preceded by Richard M. Clark	Commander of the Third Air Force; 2018–2020	Succeeded by Randall Reed
Preceded by Christopher Craige	Director of Strategy, Engagement and Programs of the United States Africa Command; 2020–2021	Succeeded by Kenneth P. Ekman
