= Caroline M. Miller =

U.S. Air Force general

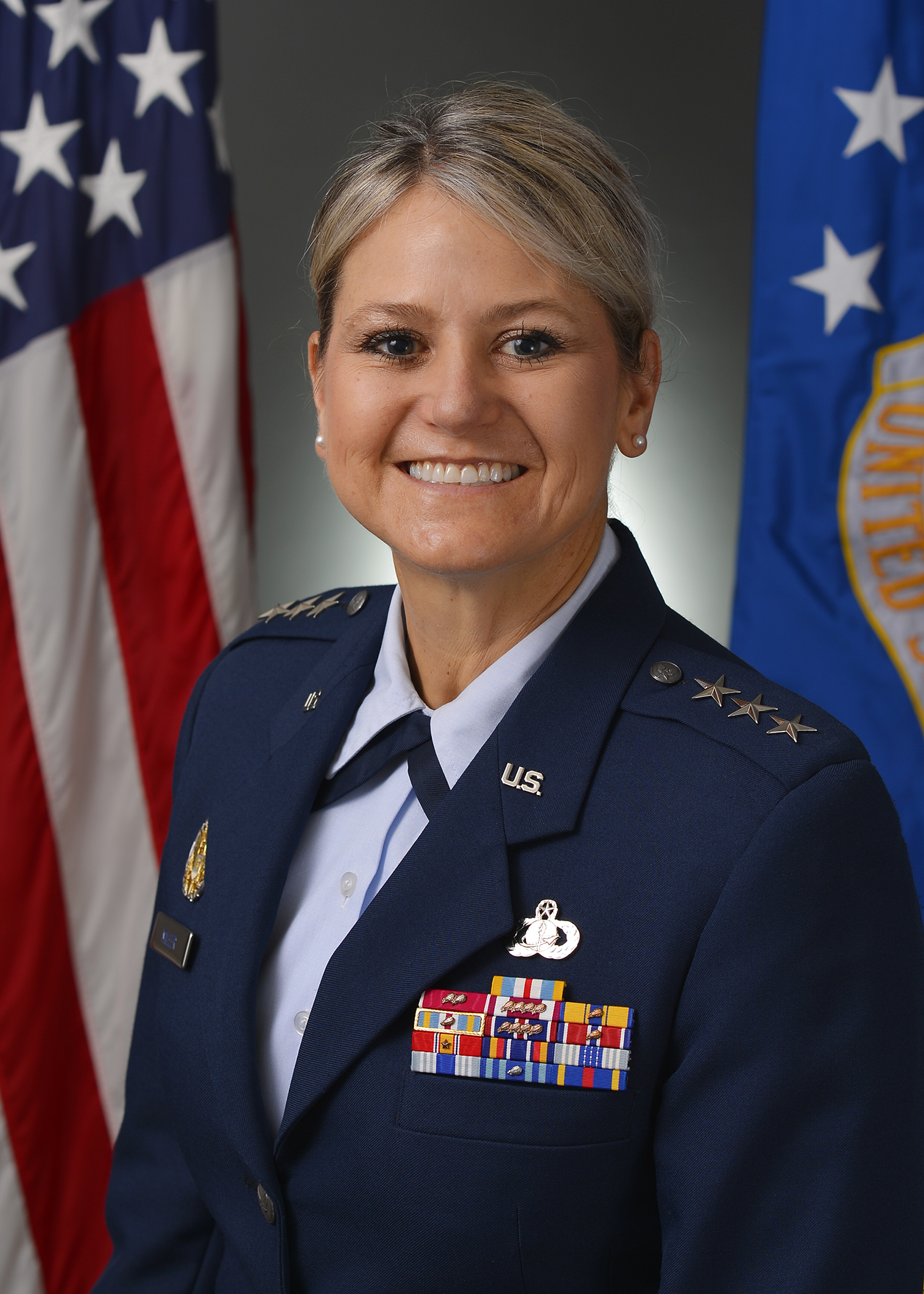
- Official portrait, 2022
- Born: c. 1968 (age 57–58)
- Military career
- Allegiance: United States
- Branch: United States Air Force
- Service years: 1994–2026
- Rank: Lieutenant General
- Commands: 502nd Air Base Wing and Joint Base San Antonio; 633rd Air Base Wing; 379th Expeditionary Mission Support Group; 1st Force Support Squadron; 1st Mission Support Squadron
- Awards: Defense Superior Service Medal; Legion of Merit (3)
- Caroline M. Miller's voice Miller's opening statement at a House Armed Services Military Personnel Subcommittee hearing on the 2023 military personnel posture Recorded March 29, 2023

Caroline M. Miller (born c. 1967) is a retired United States Air Force lieutenant general who served as the deputy chief of staff for manpower, personnel, and services of the United States Air Force from 2022 to 2026. She most recently served as the commander of the 502nd Air Base Wing and Joint Base San Antonio from 22 November 2020 to 3 May 2022, and previously served as director of manpower, organization, and resources of United States Air Force from June 2019 to June 2020.

She is the third active-duty woman in the Air Force to hold the rank of lieutenant general.

== Controversies ==
In August 2025, she reverted her predecessor decision not to allow military honors for Ashli Babbitt, a protester shot while breaking into the Capitol on January 6. The action was considered as it “would bring discredit upon the U.S. Air Force.” per then-Air Force Lt. Gen. Brian Kelly

=== Service summary ===
==== Dates of Rank ====
Promotions
Rank	Date
Second Lieutenant	21 January 1994
First Lieutenant	21 January 1996
Captain	21 January 1998
Major	1 April 2004
Lieutenant Colonel	1 June 2008
Colonel	1 October 2013
Brigadier General	3 July 2019
Lieutenant General	26 May 2022

Military offices
Preceded by John J. Allen	Commander of the 633rd Air Base Wing; 2015–2017	Succeeded by Sean K. Tyler
Preceded by John J. Allen	Chief Senate Legislative Liaison of the United States Air Force; 2017–2019	Succeeded by Neil R. Richardson
Preceded by Troy E. Dunn	Director of Manpower, Organization, and Resources of United States Air Force; 2019–2020	Succeeded by Gentry Boswell
Preceded by Laura Lenderman	Commander of the 502nd Air Base Wing and Joint Base San Antonio; 2020–2022	Succeeded by Russell D. Driggers
Preceded by Gwendolyn DeFilippi; Acting	Deputy Chief of Staff for Manpower, Personnel, and Services of the United States Air Force; 2022–2026	Succeeded by Jefferson J. O'Donnell
