= Stephen W. Oliver =

U.S. Air Force general

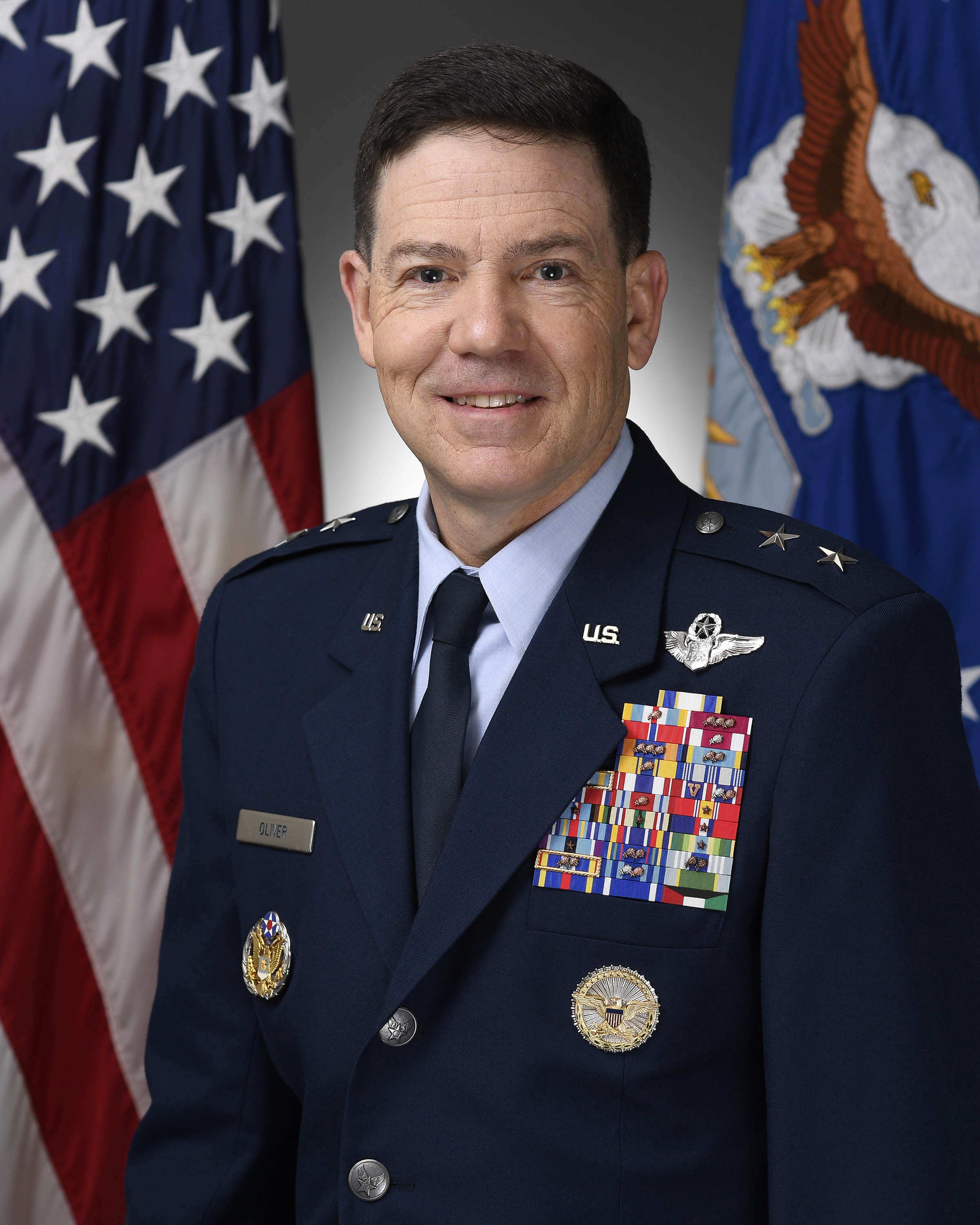
- Military career
- Allegiance: United States
- Branch: United States Air Force
- Service years: 1989-present (37 years)
- Rank: Major General
- Commands: 515th Air Mobility Operations Wing; 777th Expeditionary Airlift Squadron; 463rd Operations Support Squadron
- Awards: Air Force Distinguished Service Medal; Defense Superior Service Medal (2); Legion of Merit (4)

Stephen W. Oliver is a United States Air Force major general who served as the assistant deputy under secretary for international affairs of the U.S. Air Force. Previously, he was the vice commander of the USAF Expeditionary Center.

Military offices
Preceded by Thomas L. Gibson	Vice Commander of the USAF Expeditionary Center; 2016–2017	Succeeded by William M. Knight
Preceded by Lawrence M. Martin	Assistant Deputy Under Secretary of the Air Force for International Affairs of the United States Air Force; 2017–2020	Succeeded by John R. Gordy
