= Andrew Toth =

U.S. Air Force general

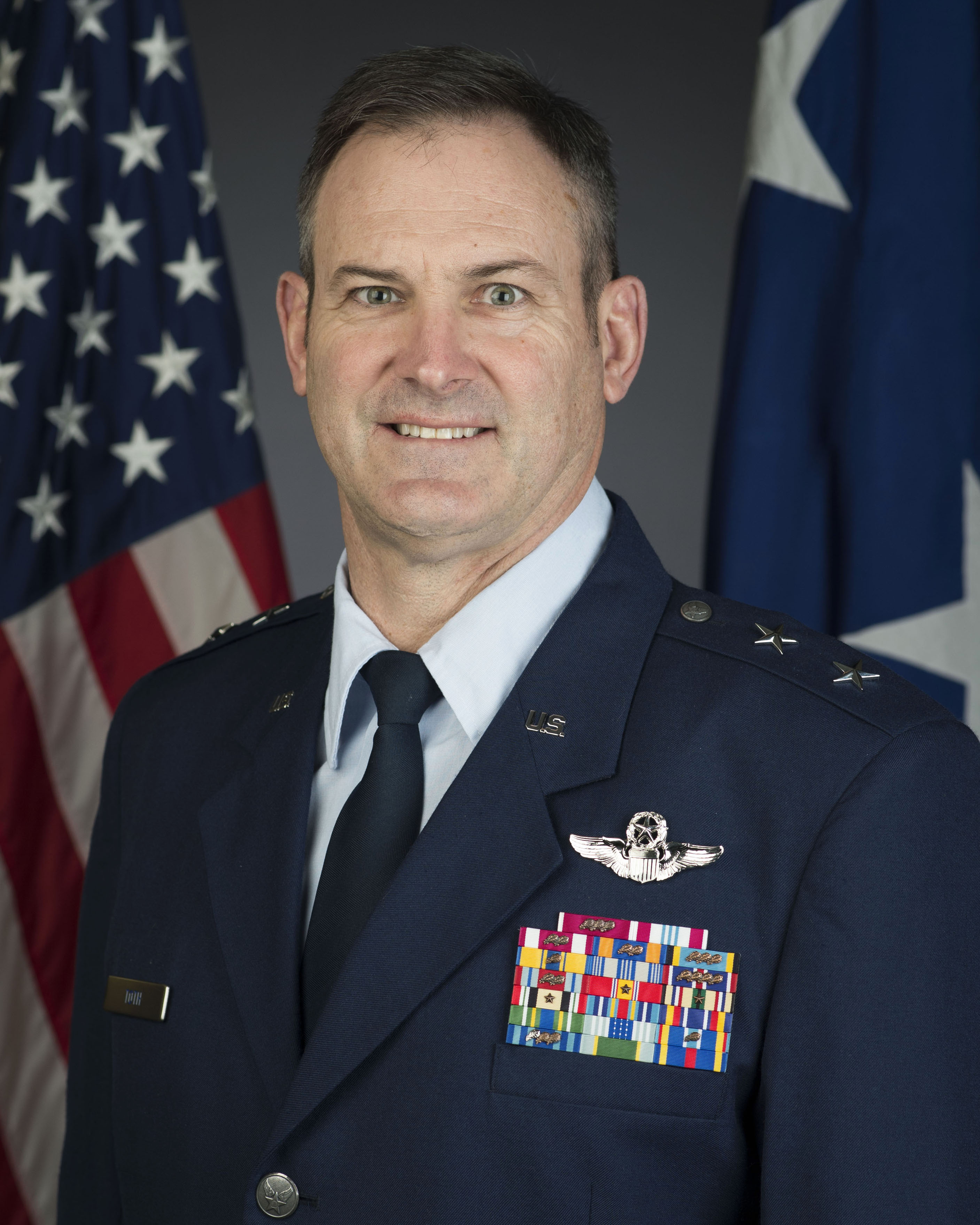
- Military career
- Allegiance: United States
- Branch: United States Air Force
- Service years: 1989-2020 (37 years)
- Rank: Major General
- Commands: Air Force Personnel Center; 36th Wing; 33rd Fighter Wing; 57th Adversary Tactics Group; 60th Fighter Squadron
- Awards: Legion of Merit (4)

Andrew J. Toth is a retired United States Air Force major general who last served as the commander of the Air Force Personnel Center. Previously, he was the Director of Operations of the Air Combat Command.

Military offices
Preceded by ???	Assistant Deputy Commander of the United States Air Forces Central Command; 2016–2017	Succeeded by Matthew Isler
Preceded by Thomas Deale	Director of Operations of the Air Combat Command; 2017–2018	Succeeded by Kevin Huyck
Preceded by Brian T. Kelly	Commander of the Air Force Personnel Center; 2018–2020	Succeeded by Christopher Craige
