= Christopher Craige =

U.S. Air Force general

Christopher E. Craige
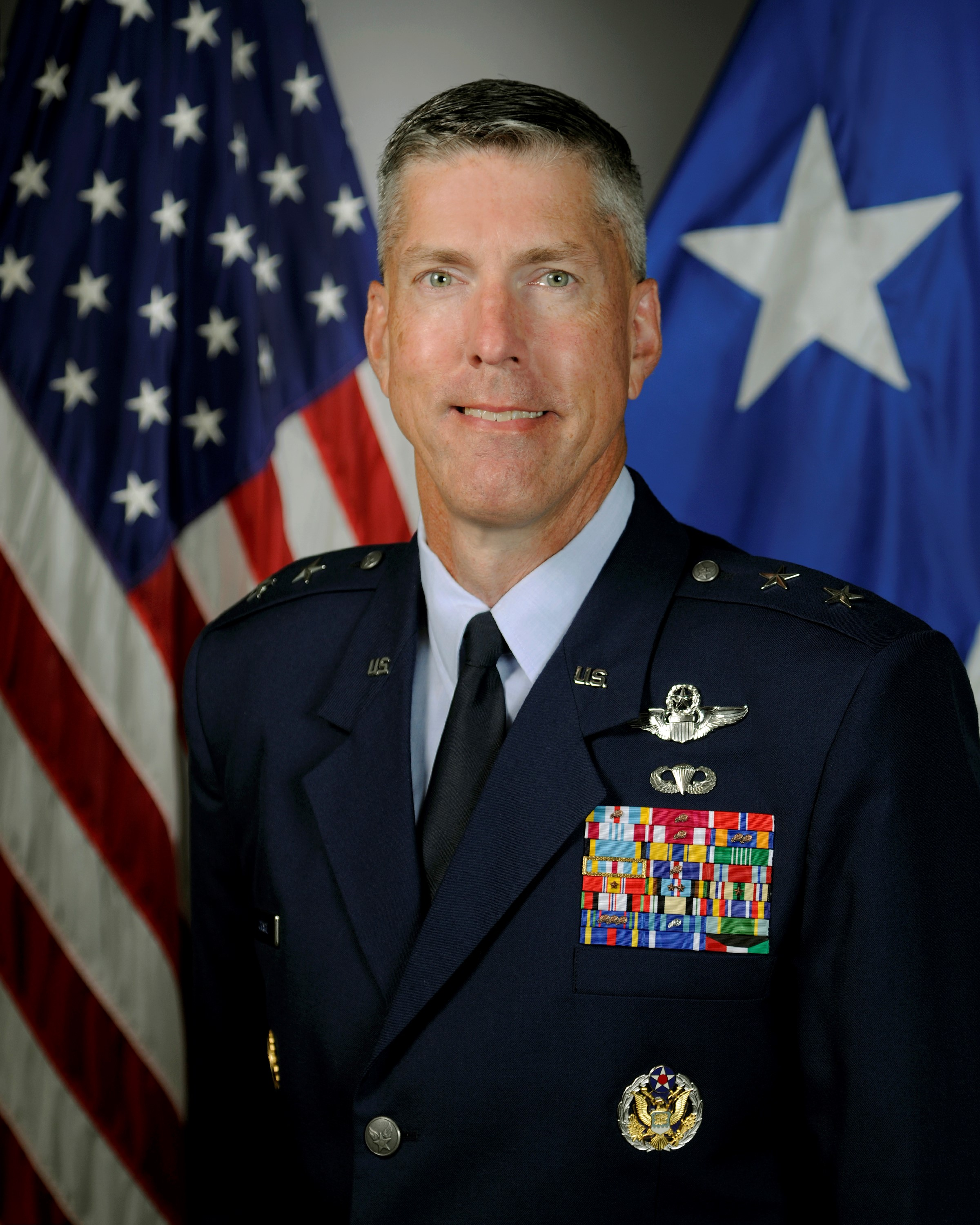
- Official portrait, 2020
- Born: Falls Church, Virginia, U.S.
- Military career
- Allegiance: United States
- Branch: United States Air Force
- Service years: 1991–2022
- Rank: Major general
- Commands: Air Force Personnel Center; 438th Air Expeditionary Wing; 39th Air Base Wing
- Awards: Defense Superior Service Medal; Legion of Merit

Christopher Earle Craige is a retired United States Air Force major general who last served as the commander of the Air Force Personnel Center. Previously, he was the director of strategy, engagement, programs of the United States Africa Command.

Military offices
Preceded by Eric Beene	Commander of the 39th Air Base Wing; 2011–2013	Succeeded by Craig D. Wills
Preceded by ???	Commander of the 438th Air Expeditionary Wing; 2015–2016	Succeeded by David W. Hicks
Preceded by Christopher J. Bence	Vice Commander of the Third Air Force; 2016–2017	Succeeded by Joseph D. McFall
Preceded by ???	Chief of Staff of the United States Air Forces in Europe – Air Forces Africa; 2017–2018	Succeeded by Richard G. Moore
Preceded by Barre Seguin	Director of Strategy, Engagement, and Programs of the United States Africa Command; 2018–2020	Succeeded by John M. Wood
Preceded by Andrew Toth	Commander of the Air Force Personnel Center; 2020–2022	Succeeded by Troy E. Dunn
