= Gentry Boswell =

U.S. Air Force general

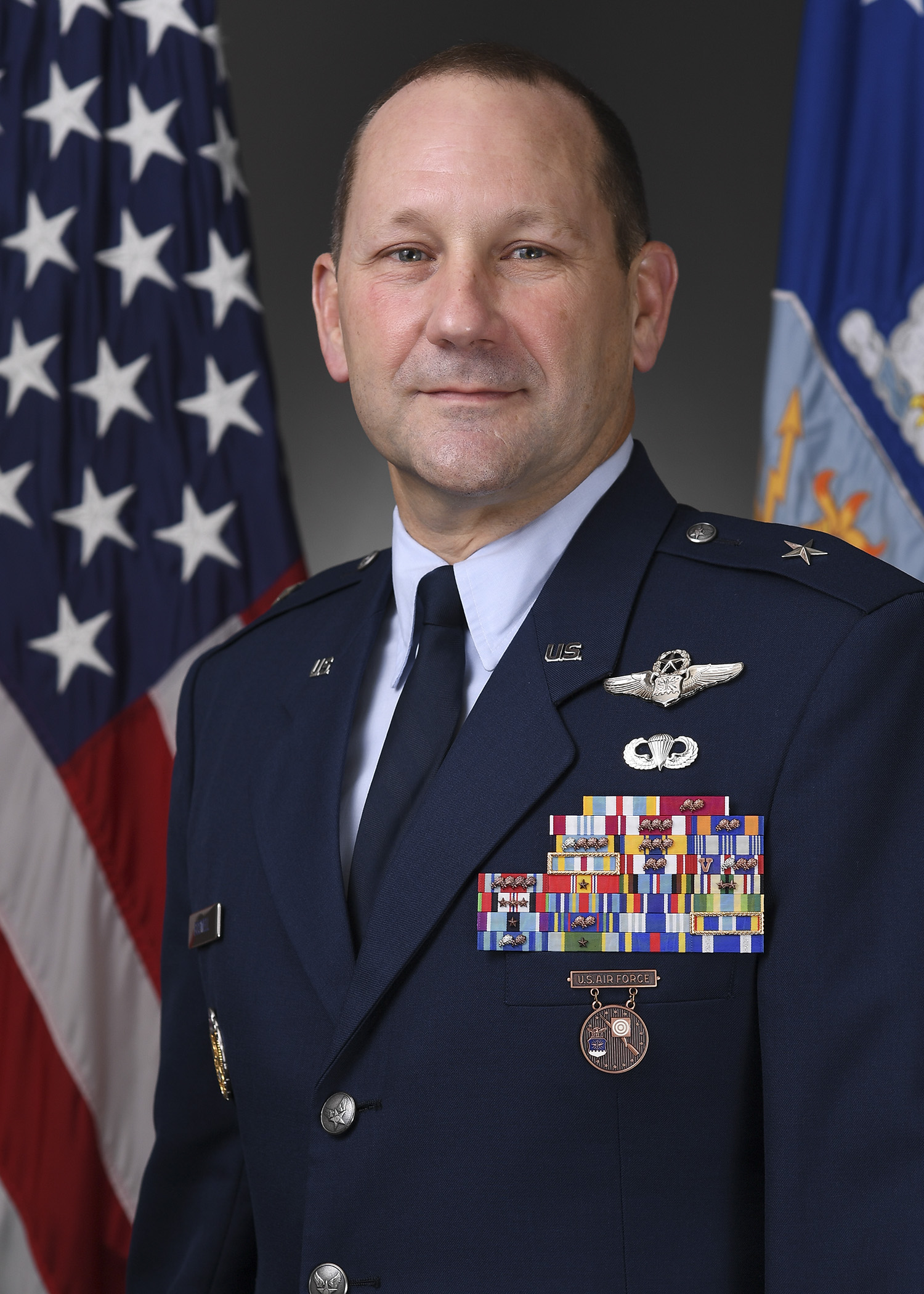
- Official portrait, 2020
- Military career
- Allegiance: United States
- Branch: United States Air Force
- Service years: 1991–2022
- Rank: Brigadier general
- Commands: 36th Wing; 28th Bomb Wing; 28th Operations Support Squadron
- Awards: Defense Superior Service Medal; Legion of Merit (3)

Gentry W. Boswell is a retired United States Air Force brigadier general who served as the director of manpower, organization, and resources of the United States Air Force. He was previously the commander of the 36th Wing and deputy commander of Joint Region Marianas.

Military offices
Preceded by Kevin B. Kennedy Jr.	Commander of the 28th Bomb Wing; 2015–2017	Succeeded by John R. Edwards
Preceded by Ferdinand Stoss	Director of Operations and Communications of the Air Force Global Strike Command; 2018	Succeeded by John T. Wilcox
Preceded by Douglas A. Cox	Commander of the 36th Wing and Deputy Commander of Joint Region Marianas; 2018–2020	Succeeded by Jeremy T. Sloane
Preceded by Caroline M. Miller	Director of Manpower, Organization, and Resources of the United States Air Force; 2020–2022	Succeeded by Shawn W. Campbell
