= Sierra Bombardment Group =

- Active: December 1941-February 1942
- Country: United States
- Branch: United States Army Air Corps

The Sierra Bombardment Group was a provisional United States Army Air Corps organization. It was established on 8 December 1941 at Minter Field, California. It consisted of air crews and ten B-17E Flying Fortresses formerly assigned to the 7th Bombardment Group 32d Bombardment Squadron and 427th Bombardment Squadron. In addition, thirty five B-25 Mitchell medium bombers of the 17th Bombardment Group, Second Air Force, Pendleton Army Airfield, Oregon, were also assigned.

The squadrons were located in the Western United States and were awaiting transfer to the Philippines in early December 1941. After the Pearl Harbor Attack, the provisional unit was formed. It performed coastal patrols for a short time stationed at Muroc Army Airfield, California, but as the conditions in the Philippines worsened, the B-17s departed via Hawaii on 17 December. However upon arrival at Hickam Field, the aircraft were pressed into service for defensive reconnaissance patrols. Three B-17s were released and were allowed to depart for Mindanao, but were diverted to Java, Netherlands East Indies, where they were assigned to evacuated 19th BG components that were operating from Singosari Airfield. The remainder stayed at Hickam until 10 January when they flew to Australia via Christmas Island; Kanton Island and Fiji where the aircraft were held for almost a week while Vichy French guerrilla activity was put down. Upon arrival at Townville, Queensland, unit was assigned to the 19th Bombardment Group as replacements.

The B-25 Mitchells remained in Oregon and continued to provide coastal antisubmarine patrols along the Northwest Pacific Coast. However, the available aircraft were not equipped with radar or other devices, and detection of enemy submarines depended solely on eyesight. The antisubmarine aircrews occasionally mistook whales and floating logs for Japanese submarines, They frequently reported and attacked enemy submarines, but rarely confirmed results. A B-25 crew claimed they bombed a submarine near the mouth of the Columbia River on 24 December 1941. They claimed it sank, but in fact no Japanese submarine was sunk off the West Coast during World War II.

The unit was discontinued in early February 1942
