= James B. Davis (general) =

United States general

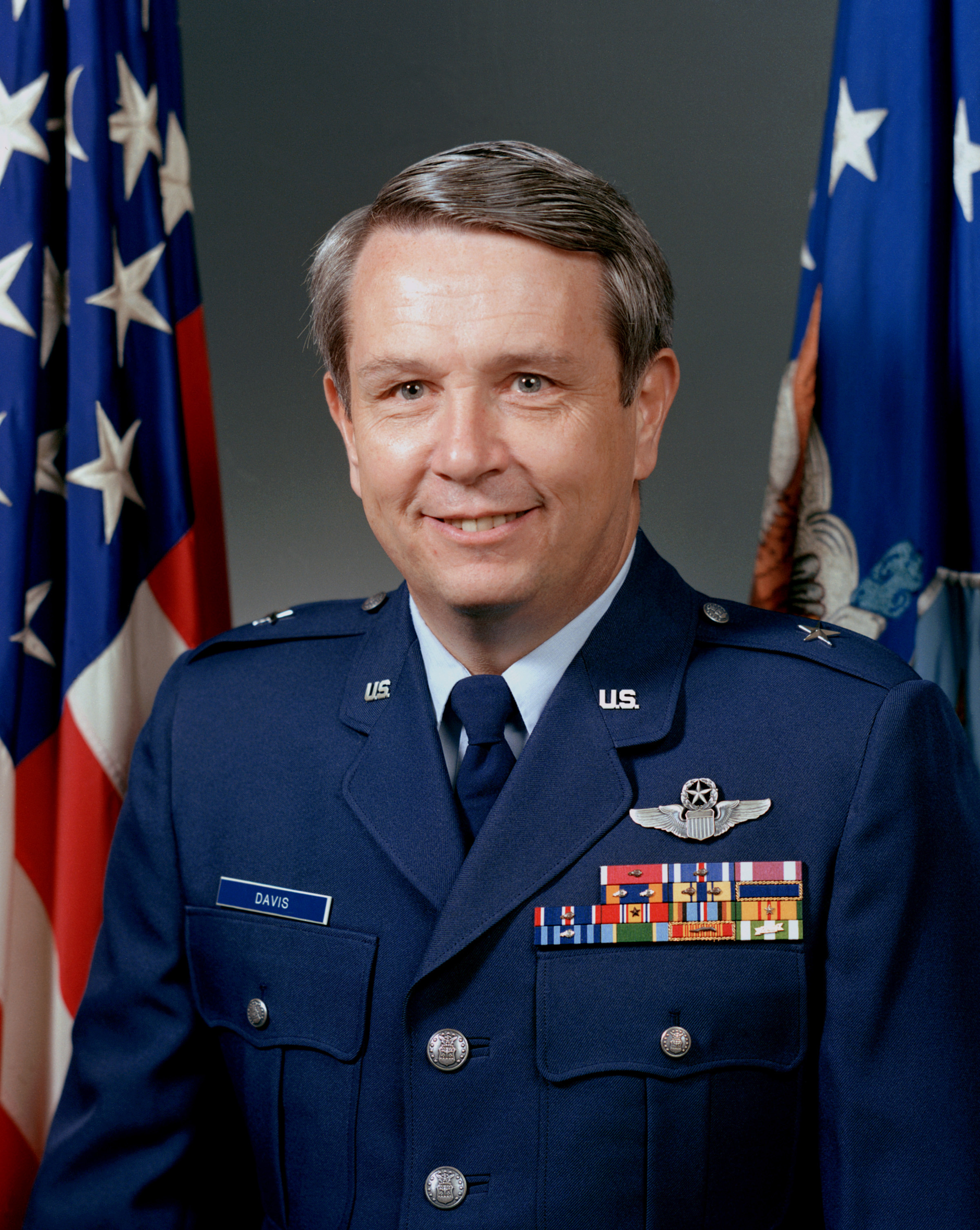
- General James B. Davis (shown while Brigadier General)
- Born: November 14, 1935 (age 90); Wayne, Nebraska, U.S.
- Military career
- Allegiance: United States of America
- Branch: United States Air Force
- Service years: 1958–1993
- Rank: General
- Commands: U.S. Forces, Japan; 5th Air Force
- Conflicts: Vietnam War
- Awards: Legion of Merit (3); Distinguished Flying Cross (2); Air Medal (11); Grand Cordon of the Order of the Sacred Treasure

General James Burr Davis (born November 14, 1935) is a retired United States Air Force (USAF) general and was chief of staff, Supreme Headquarters Allied Powers Europe in Mons, Belgium.

== Biography ==
=== Early life and qualifications ===
General Davis was born in Wayne, Nebraska, in 1935, (Parents Mary Ellen Vallery & Burr Russell Davis) where he attended Wayne City High School and Wayne State College. He earned a bachelor's degree in electrical engineering from the U.S. Naval Academy in 1958 and a master's degree in public administration from Auburn University in 1976. He completed Armed Forces Staff College in 1971 and Air War College as a distinguished graduate in 1976.

=== Early flight experience ===
Davis completed pilot training at Bartow Air Force Base, Florida, and Greenville Air Force Base, Mississippi. After receiving wings in 1959, he was assigned as a KC-97 Stratofreighter pilot with the 4050th Air Refueling Wing, Westover Air Force Base, Massachusetts. In December 1964 he was assigned to Headquarters 8th Air Force, Westover. In July 1966 he moved to the Office of the Deputy Chief of Staff for Personnel, Headquarters U.S. Air Force, Washington, D.C., as an action officer in the Special Actions Branch. He transferred in June 1967 to George Air Force Base, California for F-4 Phantom II replacement training.

=== Vietnam ===
In January 1968 the general was assigned to the 13th Tactical Fighter Squadron, Udon Royal Thai Air Force Base, Thailand, serving as a combat pilot and assistant operations officer. By September 1968 he had flown 100 combat missions over North Vietnam. In October 1968 he was selected as aide to the commander in chief, United States Air Forces in Europe, Lindsey Air Station, West Germany. Three months later, when the commander in chief was assigned to Supreme Headquarters Allied Powers Europe in Belgium, General Davis also moved and became the aide to the chief of staff there.

=== Staff college ===
After graduating from the Armed Forces Staff College in June 1971, he transferred to the Air Force Military Personnel Center at Randolph Air Force Base, Texas. During this tour of duty, he served as chief, Special Category Manning Section, then deputy chief and, later, chief of the Rated Career Management Branch. In June 1976 he graduated from the Air War College and was assigned to the 388th Tactical Fighter Wing, Hill Air Force Base, Utah, first as assistant deputy commander for operations, then as deputy commander for operations and, later, as vice commander.

=== Commands ===
From May 1979 to June 1980 he commanded the 474th Tactical Fighter Wing, Nellis Air Force Base, Nevada. General Davis then transferred to Langley Air Force Base, Virginia, and served as Tactical Air Command's deputy chief of staff for personnel. In September 1982 he was assigned as director of personnel programs in the Office of the Deputy Chief of Staff, Manpower and Personnel, Air Force headquarters. The general became assistant deputy chief of staff for military personnel, Air Force headquarters, and commander, Air Force Military Personnel Center, in September 1984. He then served as deputy chief of staff for operations and intelligence, Headquarters Pacific Air Forces, Hickam Air Force Base, Hawaii, from August 1986 until August 1987, when he became vice commander in chief, Pacific Air Forces. From January 1988 until July 1991 he was commander of U.S. Forces Japan, and 5th Air Force, Yokota Air Base, Japan. Additionally, from November 5, 1990, until February 18, 1991. He assumed final position in July 1991.

== Honors ==
The general was a command pilot with more than 4,500 flying hours, including 270 combat hours. His military awards and decorations include:

- the Defense Distinguished Service Medal,
- the Air Force Distinguished Service Medal
- the Legion of Merit with two oak leaf clusters
- the Distinguished Flying Cross with oak leaf cluster
- the Meritorious Service Medal
- the Air Medal with 10 oak leaf clusters
- the Air Force Commendation Medal with two oak leaf clusters,
- the Presidential Unit Citation
- the Air Force Outstanding Unit Award with "V" device and two oak leaf clusters
- the National Defense Service Medal with two service stars
- the Armed Forces Expeditionary Medal
- the Vietnam Service Medal with a silver service star denoting five campaigns
- the Air Force Overseas Ribbon-Short
- the Air Force Overseas Ribbon-Long
- the Air Force Longevity Service Award Ribbon with eight oak leaf clusters
- the Small Arms Expert Marksmanship Ribbon
- the Air Force Training Ribbon
- the Republic of Vietnam Gallantry Cross Unit Citation with Palm
- the Republic of Vietnam Campaign Medal.

He has also received: the Order of National Security Merit's Gugseon Medal from South Korea, the Grand Cordon of the Order of the Sacred Treasure from Japan, and the Order of the White Elephant in the grade of Knight Grand Cross with Sash from Thailand.

Additionally, in 1990, then Lt. General Davis was inducted into the Order of the Sword, which is the highest honor noncommissioned officers of the Air Force can bestow.

as of 1992, the General's Ribbon bar appeared as such:

== Retirement ==
He was promoted to general on July 24, 1991, with same date of rank, and retired from the USAF on August 1, 1993.
