= Air Force Personnel Center =

U.S. Air Force field operating agency

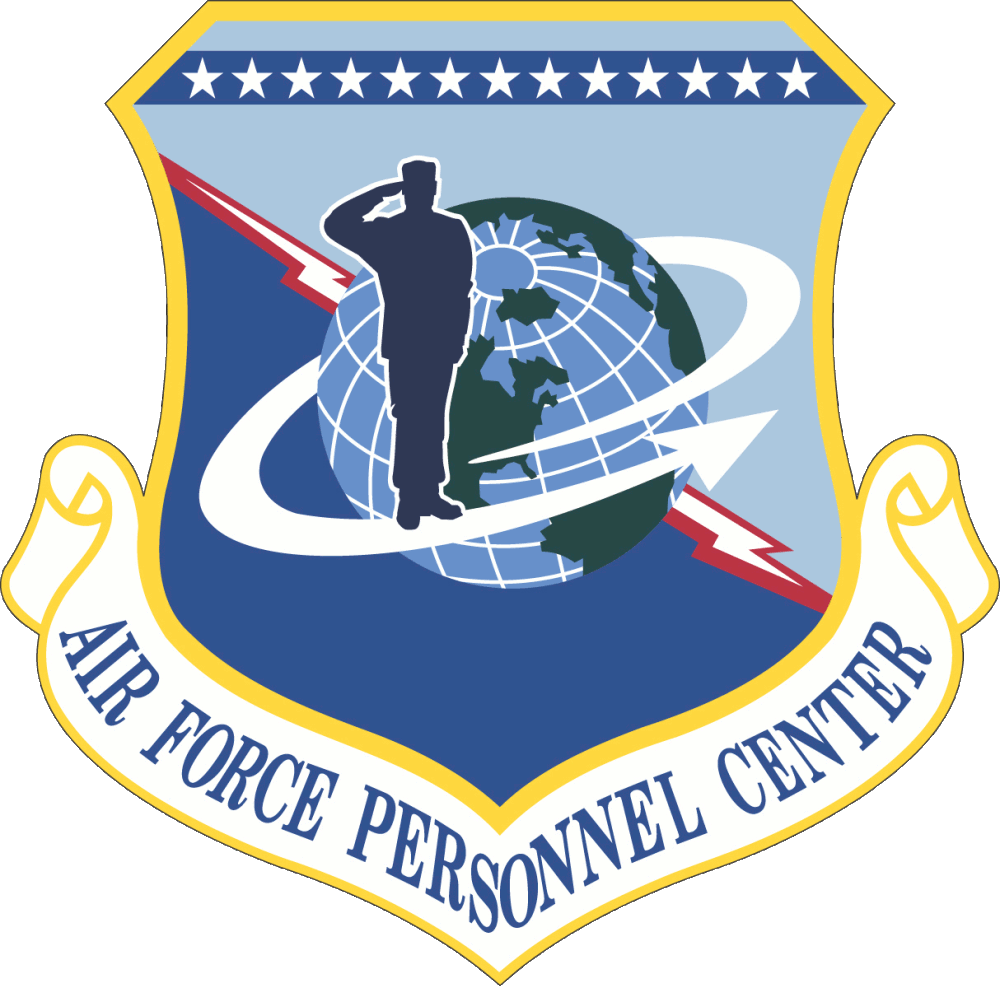
- Air Force Personnel Center Shield
- Active: 20 December 1971 – present
- Country: United States
- Branch: United States Air Force
- Role: Personnel management
- Garrison/HQ: Randolph Air Force Base
- Decorations: AFOEA

Commanders
- Current commander: Brig Gen Ryan E. Richardson

The Air Force Personnel Center (AFPC) is a field operating agency of Headquarters, U.S. Air Force, Deputy Chief of Staff for Manpower and Personnel.

AFPC operates the Air Force Contact Center, where personnel experts provide customer service. The center enhances personnel services by developing programs that enable individuals to carry out personnel actions through web-based, self-service applications, such as online retirements and virtual enlisted promotion releases.

APFC manages assignments and facilitates the professional development of all enlisted members and officers below the grade of colonel, with the exception of chief master sergeants and members of the staff judge advocate. It plays a central role in civilian force shaping and force development initiatives, providing personnel management advisory services, recruitment, and placement support, benefits and entitlements, leadership, and management training and education.

APFC manages the Sexual Assault Prevention and Response program, provides oversight to the Airman and Family Readiness Centers and oversees the Air Force Wounded Warrior Program. It maintains the records for active-duty Airmen and serves as the Air Force office of primary responsibility for worldwide casualty reporting, notification of family members and assistance to families and field commanders on benefits and entitlements. This agency is also the service's focal point for Missing in Action/Prisoner of War programs, members reported missing, captured or imprisoned and members placed in an absent without leave/deserter status. It tasks the combatant commanders' requirements by planning and monitoring readiness.

== Organization ==
AFPC is organized into six directorates.

- Directorate of Assignments responsible for managing the assignments and facilitating the professional development of all enlisted members below the rank of chief master sergeant and officers below the grade of colonel, with the exception of members of the staff judge advocate.
- Directorate of Civilian Force Integration responsible for the development and assignment of civilian personnel in 21 different career fields.
- Directorate of Force Operations oversees training and readiness of active duty, guard, reserve, and civilian personnel to execute wartime and contingency operations. Additionally, the directorate is the Air Force focal point for casualty reporting and support and the Missing in Action/Prisoner of War programs.
- Directorate of Personnel Data Systems develops and integrates information technology based services for personnel matters.
- Directorate of Personnel Services develops guidance, procedures, and training for Air Force members, including recruitment, accessions, retraining, evaluations, education and training, promotions, awards and decorations, duty status, reenlistments, separations, retirements, entitlements and benefits, retiree services and the Air Force Disability Program.

== History ==
The Air Force Military Personnel Center was established 1 April 1963, as a Headquarters Air Force field extension of the Deputy Chief of Staff, Personnel, and in 1971 became a separate operating agency. Its name was changed to the Air Force Manpower and Personnel Center in 1978, when the Air Force integrated the manpower and personnel functions at U.S. Air Force Headquarters level. In October 1985, the manpower function was realigned and separated from personnel. This resulted in the center being renamed the Air Force Military Personnel Center on 1 January 1986. The center became a field operating agency on 5 February 1991.

The former Civilian Personnel Operations was established on 1 July 1976 and was a direct reporting unit of the Air Force Directorate of Civilian Personnel until 1991 when it was renamed the Air Force Civilian Personnel Management Center and became a field operating agency. It became a directorate within the Air Force Personnel Center 1 October 1995. On 29 August 2006, the Air and Space Expeditionary Force Center at Langley Air Force Base, Virginia, became a direct reporting unit of the Personnel Center. It became the center's newest directorate on 1 October 2007.

== List of commanders ==
- Brig Gen John R. Dyas
- Maj Gen G.B. Greene Jr.
- Gen Robert J. Dixon
- Maj Gen Rene G. Dupont
- Lt Gen K.L. Tallman
- Maj Gen Travis R. McNeil
- Maj Gen Walter D. Druen Jr.
- Maj Gen LeRoy W. Svendsen Jr.
- Lt Gen Kenneth L. Peek Jr.
- Lt Gen Robert D. Springer
- Gen James B. Davis
- Lt Gen Ralph E. Havens
- Gen Billy J. Boles
- Lt Gen John E. Jackson Jr.
- Lt Gen Michael D. McGinty
- Maj Gen William B. Davitte
- Maj Gen Susan L. Pamerleau
- Lt Gen Donald A. Lamontagne
- Lt Gen Richard E. Brown III
- Maj Gen Michael C. McMahan, August 2001
- Maj Gen Thomas A. O'Riordan, November 2002
- Maj Gen Anthony F. Przybysklawski, July 2004
- Maj Gen K. C. McClain, January 2008
- Maj Gen Alfred J. Stewart, August 2010
- Maj Gen Margaret B. Poore, August 2013
- Maj Gen Brian T. Kelly, June 23, 2017
- Maj Gen Andrew Toth, August 9, 2018
- Maj Gen Christopher Craige, August 12, 2020
- Maj Gen Troy E. Dunn, May 19, 2022
- Maj Gen Jefferson J. O'Donnell, June 20, 2023
- Brig Gen Ryan E. Richardson, June 30, 2026
