= Randall Reed =

American Air Force general officer (born c. 1967)

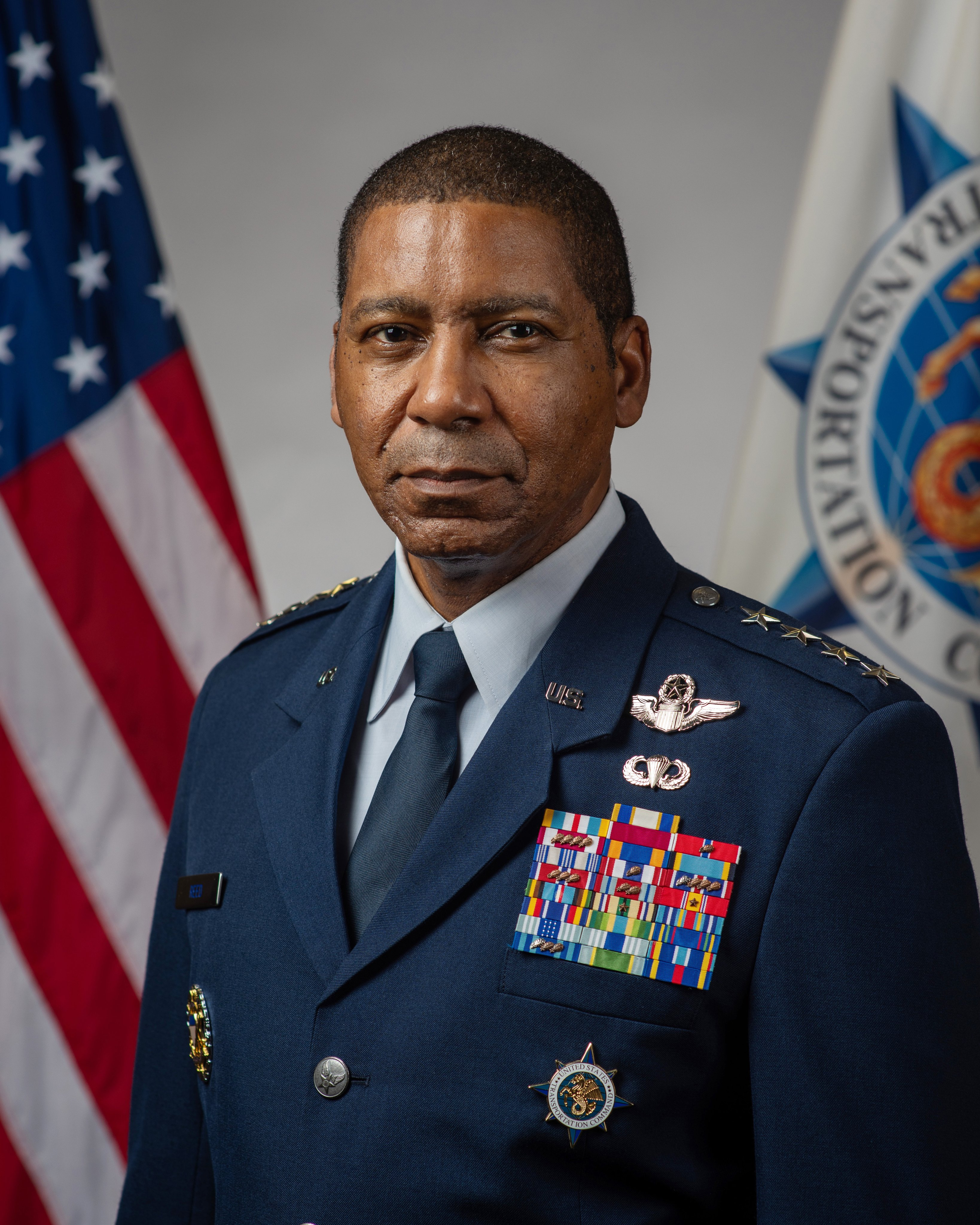
- Official portrait, 2024
- Born: c. 1967 (age 58–59)
- Branch: United States Air Force
- Service years: 1989–present
- Rank: General
- Commands: United States Transportation Command; Third Air Force; 521st Air Mobility Operations Wing; 379th Expeditionary Operations Group; 55th Air Refueling Squadron
- Awards: Air Force Distinguished Service Medal; Defense Superior Service Medal; Legion of Merit; Bronze Star Medal (2)
- Alma mater: United States Air Force Academy (BS); Embry-Riddle Aeronautical University, Daytona Beach (MS); Air University (MMAS, MMAS); National Defense University (MS)

Randall Reed (born c. 1967) is a United States Air Force general who has served as the commander of United States Transportation Command since 4 October 2024. He most recently served as the deputy commander of Air Mobility Command from 2022 to 2024. He previously commanded the Third Air Force at Ramstein Air Base from 2020 to 2022.

== Air Force career ==
Randall Reed graduated from the United States Air Force Academy with a degree in human factors engineering in 1989, and was commissioned into the United States Air Force. He attended pilot training at Laughlin AFB, and became a C-141 Starlifter pilot. In 1998, he transitioned to flying the KC-135 Stratotanker. He commanded the 55th Air Refueling Squadron, the 379th Expeditionary Operations Group, and the 521st Air Mobility Operations Wing. In 2020, he assumed command of the Third Air Force at Ramstein Air Base from Major General John Wood.

In April 2022, Reed was nominated for promotion to lieutenant general and appointment as deputy commander of Air Mobility Command.

In July 2024, Reed was nominated for promotion to general and assignment as commander of the United States Transportation Command.

== Awards and decorations ==

USAF Command Pilot wings
U.S Army Basic Parachutist Badge
U.S Air Force Distinguished Service Medal
Defense Superior Service Medal	Legion of Merit	Bronze Star Medal with bronze oak leaf cluster
Meritorious Service Medal with 4 bronze oak leaf clusters	Air Medal	Aerial Achievement Medal with bronze oak leaf cluster
Air Force Achievement Medal	Air Force Meritorious Unit with bronze oak leaf cluster	Air and Space Outstanding Unit Award with one silver oak leaf cluster and 3 bronze oak leaf clusters
Organizational Excellence with three bronze oak leaf clusters	Combat Readiness Medal with 2 bronze oak leaf clusters	National Defense Service Medal with bronze service star
Armed Forces Expeditionary Medal	Southwest Asia Service Medal with bronze service star	Global War on Terrorism Expeditionary Medal
Global War on Terrorism Service Medal	Armed Forces Service Medal	Nuclear Deterrence Operations Service Medal
Air and Space Overseas Short Tour Service Ribbon	Air and Space Overseas Long Tour Service Ribbon	Air Force Expeditionary Service Ribbon
Air and Space Longevity Service Award w/ 1 silver oak leaf cluster and 2 bronze oak leaf clusters	Small Arms Expert Marksmanship Ribbon	Air Force Training Ribbon
United States Transportation CommandBadge
Office of the Joint Chiefs of Staff Identification Badge

== Dates of promotion ==
Insignia	Rank	Date
	General	3 October 2024
	Lieutenant general	3 June 2022
	Major general	2 October 2018
	Brigadier general	12 August 2015
	Colonel	1 September 2010
	Lieutenant colonel	1 September 2005
	Major	1 September 2000
	Captain	31 May 1993
	First lieutenant	31 May 1991
	Second lieutenant	31 May 1989

Military offices
Preceded by John R. Gordy	Senior Defense Official and Defense Attaché to Turkey; 2018–2020	Succeeded by Kipling Kahler
Preceded by John M. Wood	Commander of the Third Air Force; 2020–2022	Succeeded by Derek France
Preceded by Jacqueline Van Ovost	Commander of United States Transportation Command; 2024–present	Incumbent
U.S. order of precedence (ceremonial)
Preceded by Samuel Paparo as Commander of U.S. Indo-Pacific Command	Order of precedence of the United States as Commander of U.S. Transportation Command	Succeeded by Alvin Holsey as Commander of U.S. Southern Command
