= Shawn W. Campbell =

U.S. Air Force general

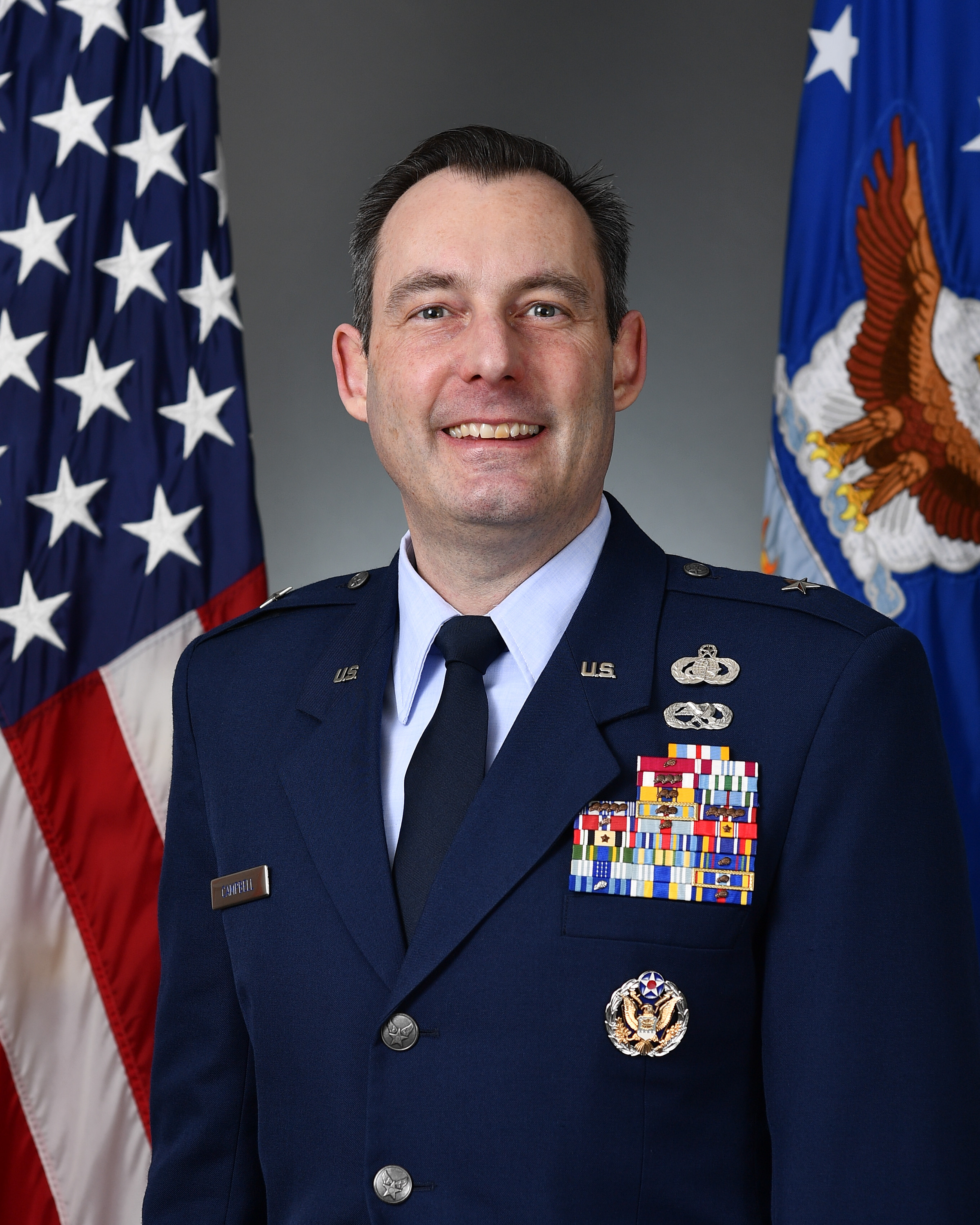
- Military career
- Allegiance: United States
- Branch: United States Air Force
- Service years: 1993–2023
- Rank: Brigadier general
- Commands: 10th Air Base Wing; 375th Mission Support Group; 62nd Services Squadron
- Awards: Air Force Distinguished Service Medal; Legion of Merit (2)

Shawn W. Campbell is a retired United States Air Force brigadier general who recently served as the assistant deputy chief of space operations for personnel of the United States Space Force. Previously, he was the director of Talent Management Innovation Cell of the United States Air Force.

Military offices
Preceded by Troy E. Dunn	Commander of the 10th Air Base Wing; 2017–2019	Succeeded by Brian Hartless
New office	Assistant Deputy Chief of Space Operations for Personnel of the United States Space Force; 2020–2021	Succeeded by Todd L. Remington
Preceded by Gentry W. Boswell	Director of Manpower, Organization, and Resources of the United States Air Force; 2021–2023	Succeeded by Debra A. Lovette
