= Troy E. Dunn =

U.S. Air Force general

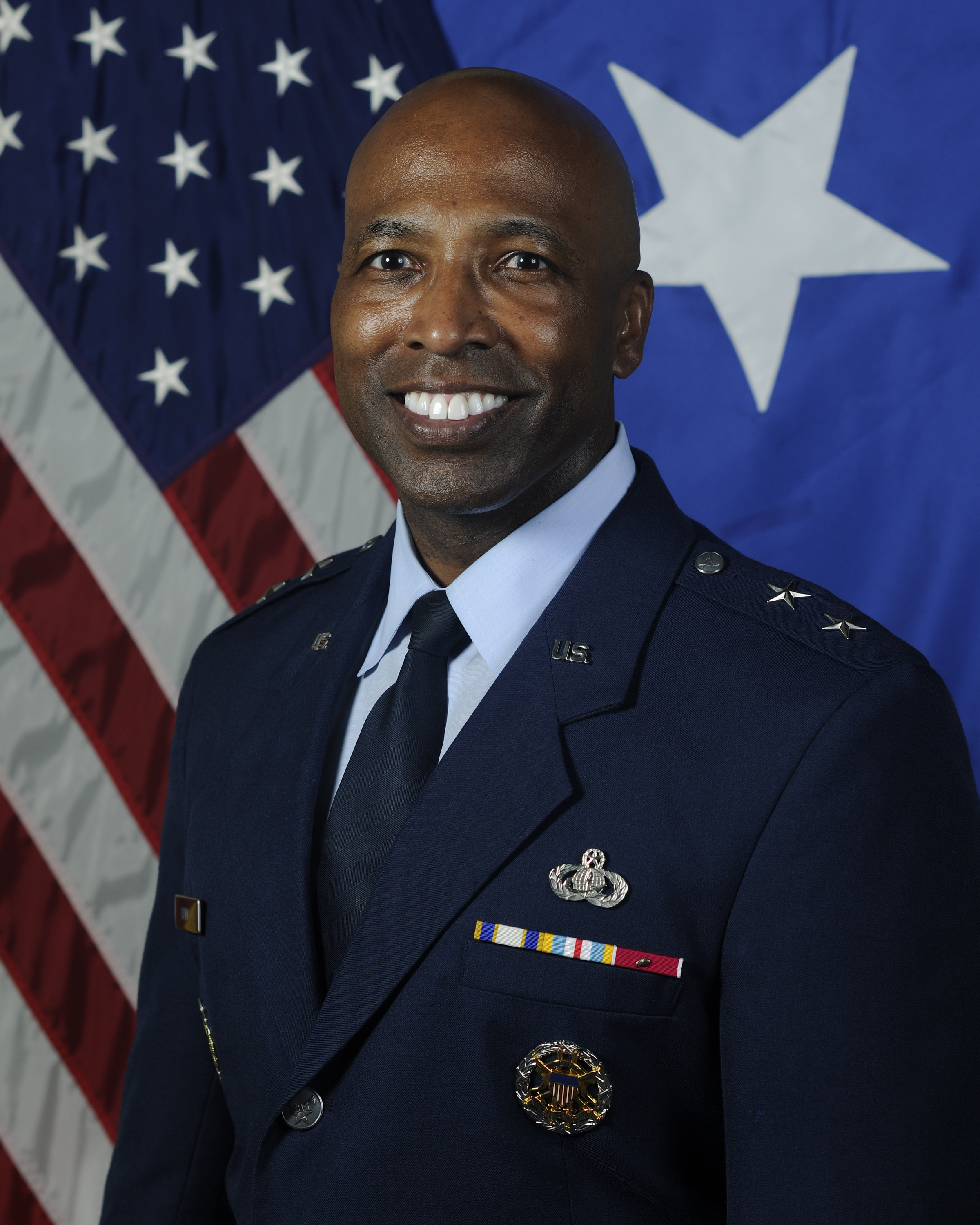
- Official portrait, 2022
- Born: Oklahoma City, Oklahoma, U.S.
- Military career
- Allegiance: United States
- Branch: United States Air Force
- Service years: 1993–2024
- Rank: Major general
- Commands: Air Force Personnel Center; 10th Air Base Wing; 86th Mission Support Group; 11th Mission Support Squadron
- Awards: Defense Superior Service Medal; Legion of Merit (2)

Troy Edward Dunn is a retired United States Air Force major general who served as special assistant and senior military advisor with duties at the Office of the Under Secretary of Defense for Personnel and Readiness from 2023 to 2024. He previously served as commander of the Air Force Personnel Center from 2022 to 2023.

Previously, he was the Director of Military Force Management Policy, Deputy Chief of Staff for Manpower, Personnel and Services, Headquarters U.S. Air Force, the Pentagon, Arlington, Virginia. The directorate is responsible for establishing military force management policies for more than 500,000 Total Force military personnel. These policies guide the accession, assignment, evaluation, skills analysis and management, promotion, readiness, retraining, retention, separation and retirement of the Air Force's human capital. The office also oversees aspects of Total Force contingency, mobilization, training and rated force management policy. Prior to that, he was Director of Manpower, Organization and Resources, Deputy Chief of Staff for Manpower, Personnel and Services, Headquarters U.S. Air Force, the Pentagon, Arlington, Va.

Maj. Gen. Dunn commissioned from the U.S. Air Force Academy in 1993 with a degree in political science. Maj. Gen. Dunn is currently married to Sonya Dunn, A film producer.

== Education ==
- 1993 Bachelor of Science, Political Science, U.S. Air Force Academy, Colorado Springs, Colo.
- 1996 Master of Business, Webster University, St Louis, Mo.
- 1998 Squadron Officer School, Maxwell Air Force Base, Ala.
- 2007 Government Affairs Institute, Capitol Hill Fellows Program, Georgetown University, Washington, D.C.
- 2011 Master of National Resource Strategy, Industrial College of the Armed Forces, National Defense University, Fort Lesley J. McNair, Washington, D.C.
- 2012 Executive Program, U.S. National Security Policy Issues, The Brookings Institution, Washington, D.C.
- 2013 Seminar XXI Fellow, Program on Foreign Politics, International Relations and the National Interest, Massachusetts Institute of Technology, Cambridge
- 2021 Advanced Senior Leader Development Seminar, Airlie Conference Center, Warrenton, Va.

== Assignments ==
- September 1993–June 1995, Squadron Adjutant, 57th Airlift Squadron, Altus Air Force Base, Oklahoma
- June 1995–May 1996, Squadron Section Commander, 561st Fighter Squadron, Nellis AFB, Nevada
- May 1996–June 1997, Squadron Section Commander and Executive Officer, 66th Rescue Squadron, Nellis AFB, Nevada
- June 1997–September 2000, Assistant Professor of Aerospace Studies, University of Southern California, Los Angeles, California
- September 2000–June 2003, Commander, Headquarters Squadron; and Chief, Personnel Programs Division, Headquarters Air Force Weather Agency, Offutt AFB, Nebraska
- July 2003–July 2004, Chief, Organization Section, Headquarters Air Mobility Command, Scott AFB, Illinois
- July 2004–June 2006, Aide-de-Camp and Assistant Executive Officer to the Commander, U.S. Transportation Command and Commander, U.S. Air Force Air Mobility Command, Scott AFB, Illinois
- June 2006–December 2007, Congressional Fellow, Staff Member for U.S. Senator Trent Lott, and Deputy National Security Advisor, United States Senate Minority Whip, Washington, D.C.
- December 2007–June 2009, Chief, Personnel Readiness System and Analysis Branch, Headquarters U.S. Air Force, the Pentagon, Arlington, Virginia
- July 2009–August 2010, Commander, 11th Mission Support Squadron, Bolling AFB, Washington, D.C.
- August 2010–June 2011, Student, Industrial College of the Armed Forces, National Defense University, Fort Lesley J. McNair, Washington, D.C.
- June 2011–May 2013, Chief, Personnel Services Division, and Vice Director, Manpower and Personnel, Joint Staff, the Pentagon, Arlington, Virginia
- May 2013–April 2015, Commander, 86th Mission Support Group, Ramstein Air Base, Germany
- May 2015–June 2017, Commander, 10th Air Base Wing, U.S. Air Force Academy, Colorado
- July 2017–June 2019, Director of Manpower, Organization and Resources, Deputy Chief of Staff for Manpower, Personnel and Services, Headquarters U.S. Air Force, the Pentagon, Arlington, Virginia
- June 2019–May 2022, Director of Military Force Management Policy, Deputy Chief of Staff for Manpower, Personnel and Services, Headquarters U.S. Air Force, the Pentagon, Arlington, Virginia
- May 2022–present, Commander, Air Force Personnel Center, Joint Base San Antonio-Randolph, Texas

== Summary of joint assignments ==
June 2011–May 2013, Chief, Personnel Services Division, and Vice Director, Manpower and Personnel, Joint Staff, the Pentagon, Arlington, Va., as a colonel

Military offices
Preceded by Stacey Hawkins	Commander of the 10th Air Base Wing; 2015–2017	Succeeded by Shawn W. Campbell
Preceded by Stephen L. Davis	Director of Manpower, Organization, and Resources of the United States Air Force; 2017–2019	Succeeded by Caroline M. Miller
Preceded by Robert LaBrutta	Director of Military Force Management Policy of the United States Air Force; 2019–2022	Succeeded by Kirsten G. Aguilar
Preceded by Christopher E. Craige	Commander of the Air Force Personnel Center; 2022–2023	Succeeded by Jefferson J. O'Donnell
