= Mark Camerer =

U.S. Air Force general

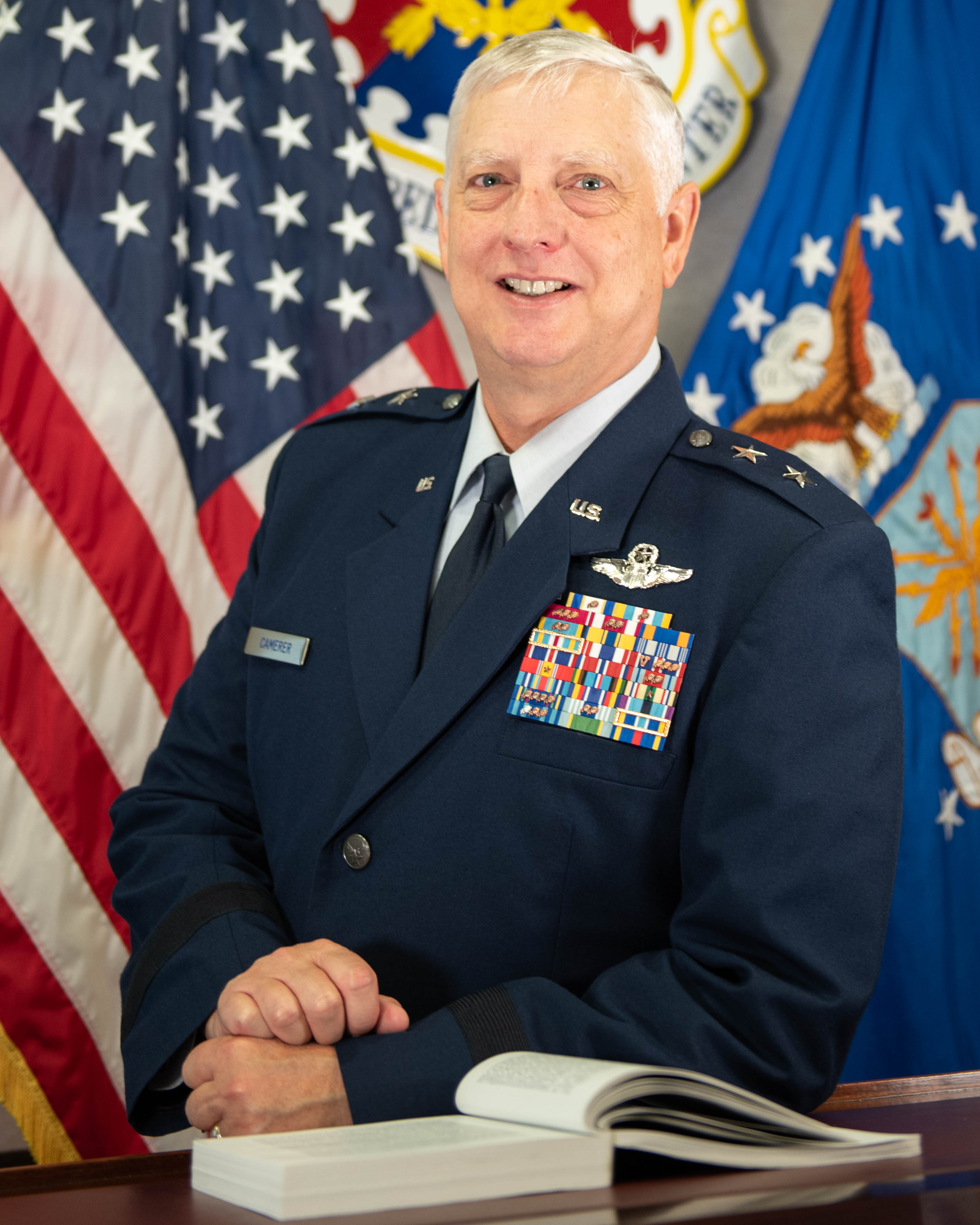
- Military career
- Allegiance: United States
- Branch: United States Air Force
- Service years: 1989-2022
- Rank: Major general
- Commands: USAF Expeditionary Center; 37th Training Wing; 436th Airlift Wing; 6th Airlift Squadron
- Awards: Air Force Distinguished Service Medal (2); Defense Superior Service Medal (2); Legion of Merit (4)

Mark D. Camerer is a retired United States Air Force major general who last served as the United States Air Force Expeditionary Center commander. Previously, he was the director of strategic plans, requirements, and programs of the Air Mobility Command.

Military offices
Preceded by ???	Director of Logistics of the United States Africa Command; 2016–2018	Succeeded by Leonard Kosinski
Preceded by John M. Wood	Director of Strategic Plans, Requirements, and Programs of the Air Mobility Command; 2018–2020	Succeeded by Kyle Kremer
Preceded by John R. Gordy	Commander of the United States Air Force Expeditionary Center; 2020–present	Incumbent
