= Leonard Kosinski =

U.S. Air Force general

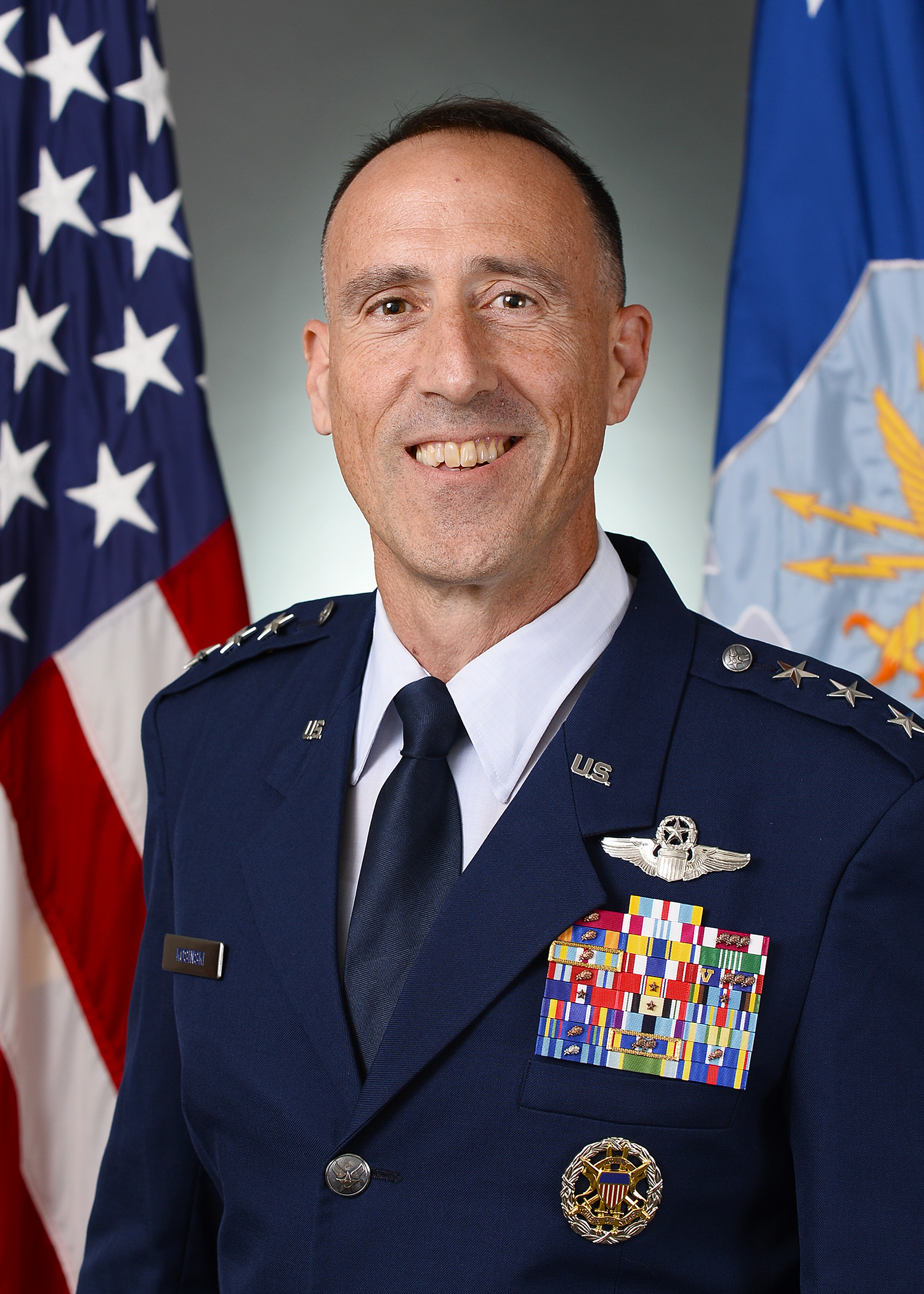
- Official portrait, 2022
- Born: 1971 or 1972 (age 54–55); Bullhead City, Arizona, U.S.
- Military career
- Allegiance: United States
- Branch: United States Air Force
- Service years: 1993–2024
- Rank: Lieutenant General
- Commands: 62nd Airlift Wing; Heavy Airlift Squadron; 817th Expeditionary Airlift Squadron
- Awards: Defense Superior Service Medal; Legion of Merit (3)

Leonard John Kosinski (born 1971/1972) is a retired United States Air Force lieutenant general who served as the director for logistics of the Joint Staff from 2020 to 2024. He previously served as the deputy commander of the Fifth Air Force from 2020 to 2022.

In April 2022, Kosinski was nominated for promotion to lieutenant general and appointment as director of logistics of the Joint Staff.

== Honours ==
- Order of the Rising Sun, 3rd Class, Gold Rays with Neck Ribbon

Military offices
Preceded by David J. Kumashiro	Commander of the 62nd Airlift Wing; 2015–2017	Succeeded by Rebecca Sonkiss
Preceded by Mark Camerer	Director of Logistics of the United States Africa Command; 2018–2020	Succeeded by Kevin Jones
Preceded by Todd Dozier	Deputy Commander of the Fifth Air Force; 2020–2022	Succeeded by Jesse J. Friedel
Preceded by Sam C. Barrett	Director for Logistics of the Joint Staff; 2022–2024	Succeeded by Dion English
