= John R. Gordy =

U.S. Air Force general

John R. Gordy II
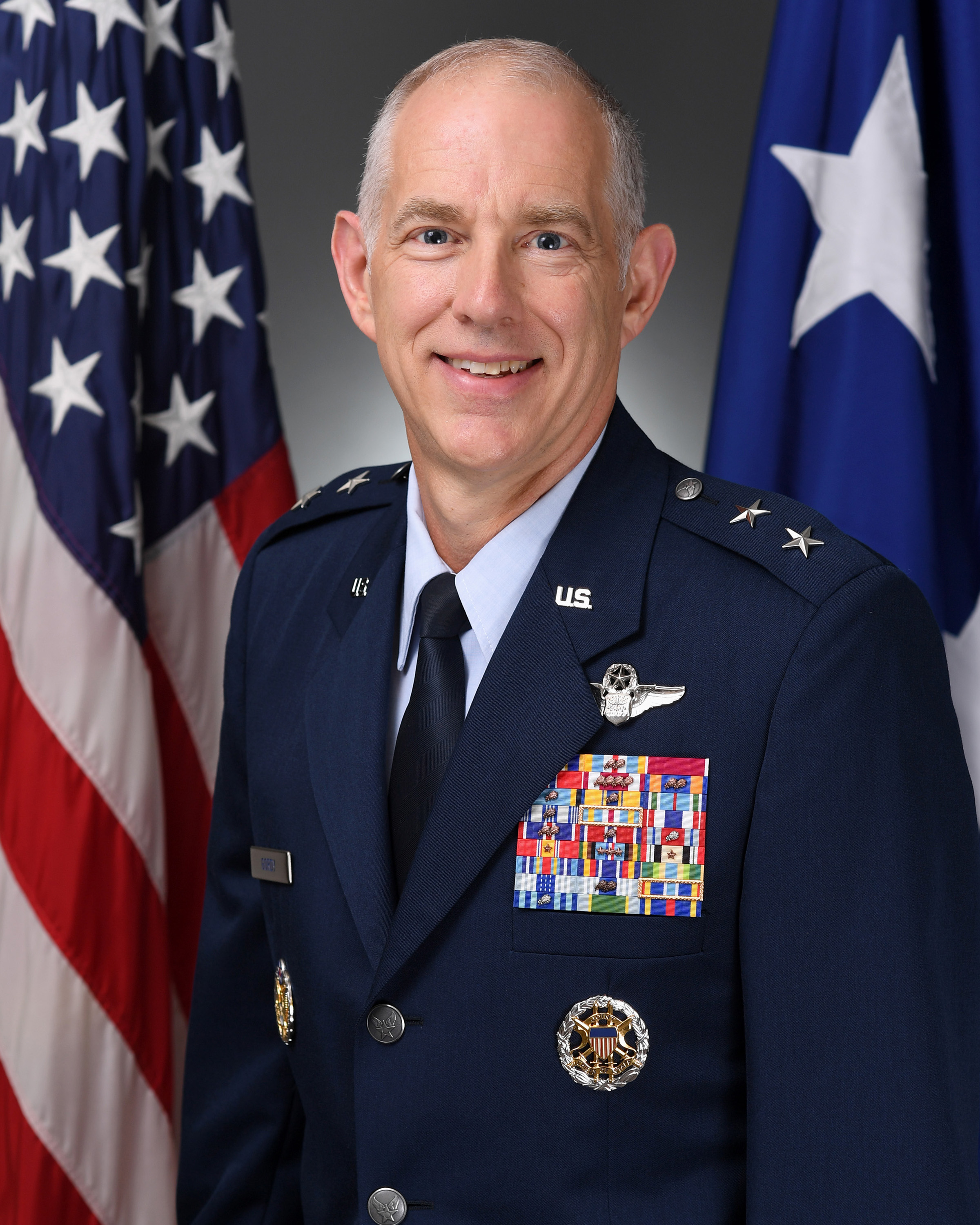
- Military career
- Allegiance: United States
- Branch: United States Air Force
- Service years: 1988–present
- Rank: Major general
- Commands: United States Air Force Expeditionary Center; 386th Air Expeditionary Wing; 29th Weapons Squadron
- Conflicts: Iraq War
- Awards: Air Force Distinguished Service Medal (2); Defense Superior Service Medal (3); Legion of Merit; Bronze Star Medal

John R. Gordy II is a United States Air Force major general who most recently was the assistant deputy under secretary for international affairs. He previously commanded the United States Air Force Expeditionary Center.

He is set to retire from active duty.

Military offices
| Preceded by Marc H. Sasseville | Senior Defense Official and Defense Attaché to Turkey; 2016–2018 | Succeeded by Randall Reed |
| Preceded by Christopher Bence | Commander of the United States Air Force Expeditionary Center; 2018–2020 | Succeeded by Mark Camerer |
| Preceded by Stephen W. Oliver | Assistant Deputy Under Secretary for International Affairs of the United States Air Force; 2020–2021 | Succeeded by E. John Teichert |
