= United States Air Force Expeditionary Center =

Coordinates: 40.009681°N 74.606187°W

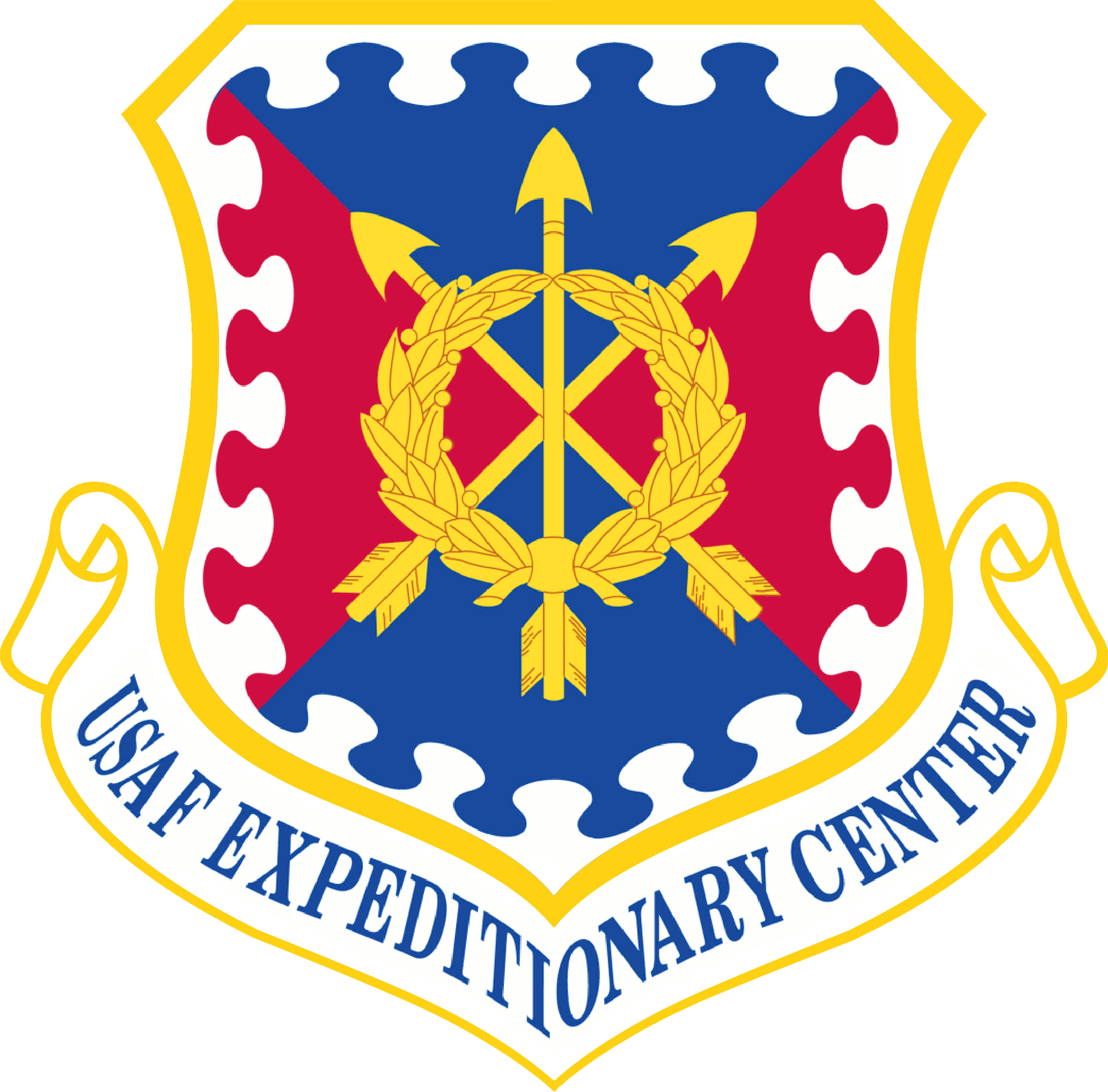
- United States Air Force Expeditionary Center emblem
- Active: 1 May 1994 – present
- Country: United States
- Branch: United States Air Force
- Role: Education and Training
- Garrison/HQ: Air Mobility Command
- Website: www.expeditionarycenter.af.mil

Commanders
- Commander: Maj Gen Darren R. Cole
- Vice Commander: Col Shane Rogers
- Command Chief: CMSgt Dennis W. Fuselier

The United States Air Force Expeditionary Center is a United States Air Force training center located at Fort Dix, New Jersey which specializes in combat support and global mobility training and education.

== Overview ==
Located on the Fort Dix entity of Joint Base McGuire–Dix–Lakehurst, N.J., the center provides global mobility training and education.

The Expeditionary Operations School at the Expeditionary Center offers 92 in-residence courses and 19 web-based training courses, graduating more than 40,000 students annually. Courses include the Air Force Phoenix Raven Training, Advanced Study of Air Mobility and Aerial Port Operations Course.

== History ==
The unit began when it was constituted as the Military Airlift Command Airlift Operations School on 5 July 1978 and activated on 15 July 1978. It was later redesignated as the USAF Air Mobility School on 1 June 1992, the Air Mobility Warfare Center on 1 October 1994, and the USAF Expeditionary Center on 5 March 2007.

The Expeditionary Center was first opened as the Air Mobility Warfare Center on 1 May 1994, and officially received its mission on 1 Oct. 1994. At first opening, the center operated at least eleven courses, ranging from combat readiness exercises to cargo and passenger transportation courses.

The center was officially renamed as U.S. Air Force Expeditionary Center on 4 March 2007. On 7 January 2011, the center expanded in scope, taking added responsibility for evolving AMC mission sets. It expanded again in the spring of 2012 to take administrative control of three more air wings, including the Air Force's only Contingency Response wing.

Through 5 September 2025, the Expeditionary Center provided command and control for three air base units (the 87th Air Base Wing, the 627th Air Base Group, and the 628th Air Base Wing), three air mobility operations units (the 43d Air Mobility Operations Group, the 515th Air Mobility Operations Wing, and the 521st Air Mobility Operations Wing), and the 621st Contingency Response Wing. Following the activation of Twenty-First Air Force, AMC reassigned these units between 18 AF and 21 AF.

== USAF Expeditionary Operations School ==
The USAF Expeditionary Operations School (“EOS”) of the USAF Expeditionary Center, is for mobility and expeditionary operations skills training and Air Mobility Command's provider of support to the mobility enterprise.

The EOS offers a variety of training, from combat support to logistics. The EOS is responsible for advanced leadership training, including Advanced Studies of Air Mobility Course and the Director of Mobility Forces Course.0

The EOS offers 74 in-resident courses and graduates approximately 40,000 students per year from the Expeditionary Center main campus at ASA Fort Dix, Joint Base McGuire-Dix-Lakehurst, NJ, from the mobile training team class and from detachments Hurlburt Air Force Base, FL, and Scott Air Force Base, IL.

== List of commanders ==
No.	Commander		Term		
No.	Portrait	Name	Took office	Left office	Term length
1	William J. Begert	Brigadier General; William J. Begert	1 October 1994	14 April 1995	195 days
2	Richard C. Marr	Major General; Richard C. Marr	14 April 1995	21 August 1997	2 years, 129 days
3	William Welser III	Major General; William Welser III	21 August 1997	5 August 1999	1 year, 349 days
4	Silas R. Johnson	Major General; Silas R. Johnson	5 August 1999	2 June 2000	302 days
-	John C. Scherer	Colonel; John C. Scherer; Acting	2 June 2000	16 June 2000	14 days
5	Robert J. Boots	Major General; Robert J. Boots	16 June 2000	26 July 2002	2 years, 40 days
6	Christopher A. Kelly	Major General; Christopher A. Kelly	26 July 2002	12 May 2005	2 years, 290 days
7	David S. Gray	Major General; David S. Gray	12 May 2005	23 May 2007	2 years, 11 days
8	Kip L. Self	Major General; Kip L. Self	23 May 2007	19 October 2009	2 years, 149 days
9	Richard T. Devereaux	Major General; Richard T. Devereaux	19 October 2009	2 October 2010	348 days
10	William J. Bender	Major General; William J. Bender	2 October 2010	29 July 2013	2 years, 300 days
-	Randall C. Guthrie	Brigadier General; Randall C. Guthrie; Acting	29 July 2013	9 September 2013	42 days
11	Frederick H. Martin	Major General; Frederick H. Martin	9 September 2013	2 August 2016	2 years, 328 days
12	Christopher Bence	Major General; Christopher Bence	2 August 2016	9 August 2018	2 years, 7 days
13	John R. Gordy	Major General; John R. Gordy	9 August 2018	23 September 2020	2 years, 45 days
14	Mark Camerer	Major General; Mark Camerer	23 September 2020	17 August 2022	1 year, 328 days
15	John M. Klein Jr.	Major General; John M. Klein Jr.	17 August 2022	12 July 2024	1 year, 330 days
16	Stephen P. Snelson	Brigadier General; Stephen P. Snelson	12 July 2024	5 September 2025	1 year, 55 days
16	Darren R. Cole	Major General; Darren R. Cole	5 September 2025	Incumbent	156 days
