= Gina Grosso =

Retired US Air Force general

Gina M. Grosso
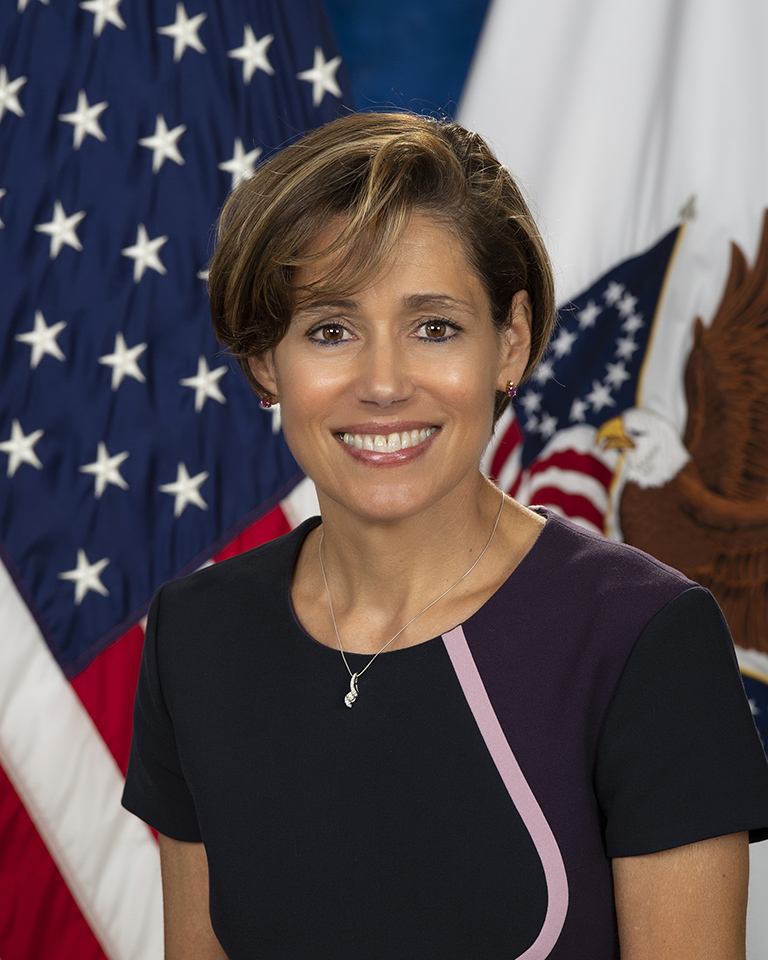
- Official portrait, 2021

Assistant Secretary of Veterans Affairs for Human Resources / Operations, Security and Preparedness
- In office June 23, 2021 – January 1, 2024
- President: Joe Biden
- Secretary: Denis McDonough
- Preceded by: Jeffrey R. Mayo (acting)

Military service
- Branch/service: United States Air Force
- Years of service: 1986–2018
- Rank: Lieutenant General
- Commands: 87th Air Base Wing; 737th Training Group; 51st Mission Support Squadron
- Awards: Defense Superior Service Medal; Legion of Merit (3); Meritorious Service Medal (4)

Gina Marie Grosso is a former American defense official and retired United States Air Force lieutenant general and former Assistant Secretary of Veteran Affairs for Human Resources and Administration/Operations, Security and Preparedness from 2021 to 2024. In the Air Force, Grosso last served as the Deputy Chief of Staff for Manpower, Personnel and Services (A1), Headquarters U.S. Air Force from October 2015 to October 2018.

General Grosso entered the Air Force in 1986 as a Reserve Officer Training Corps distinguished graduate from Carnegie-Mellon University, Pittsburgh, Pennsylvania. She held several command and staff positions throughout her career. As a staff officer, she served as an operations analyst, personnel programs analyst, Air Staff and Office of the Secretary of Defense action officer, Major Command Director of Manpower and Personnel, Director of the Air Force Colonel Management Office, Director, Manpower, Organization and Resources, and Director of Force Management Policy. Her command tours include a Headquarters Squadron Section, Military Personnel Flight, Mission Support Squadron, command of the Air Force's sole Basic Military Training Group, and as Joint Base and 87th Air Base Wing commander at Joint Base McGuire-Dix-Lakehurst, NJ. Prior to her current assignment, she was the Director of the Air Force Sexual Assault Prevention and Response (SAPR), Office of the Vice Chief of Staff, Headquarters U.S. Air Force, Washington, D.C.

Gen. Grosso was the first female personnel chief in Air Force history. She is married to Col. (USAF, Ret) Brian O'Connor, a former C-17 Globemaster III pilot.

== Education and training ==
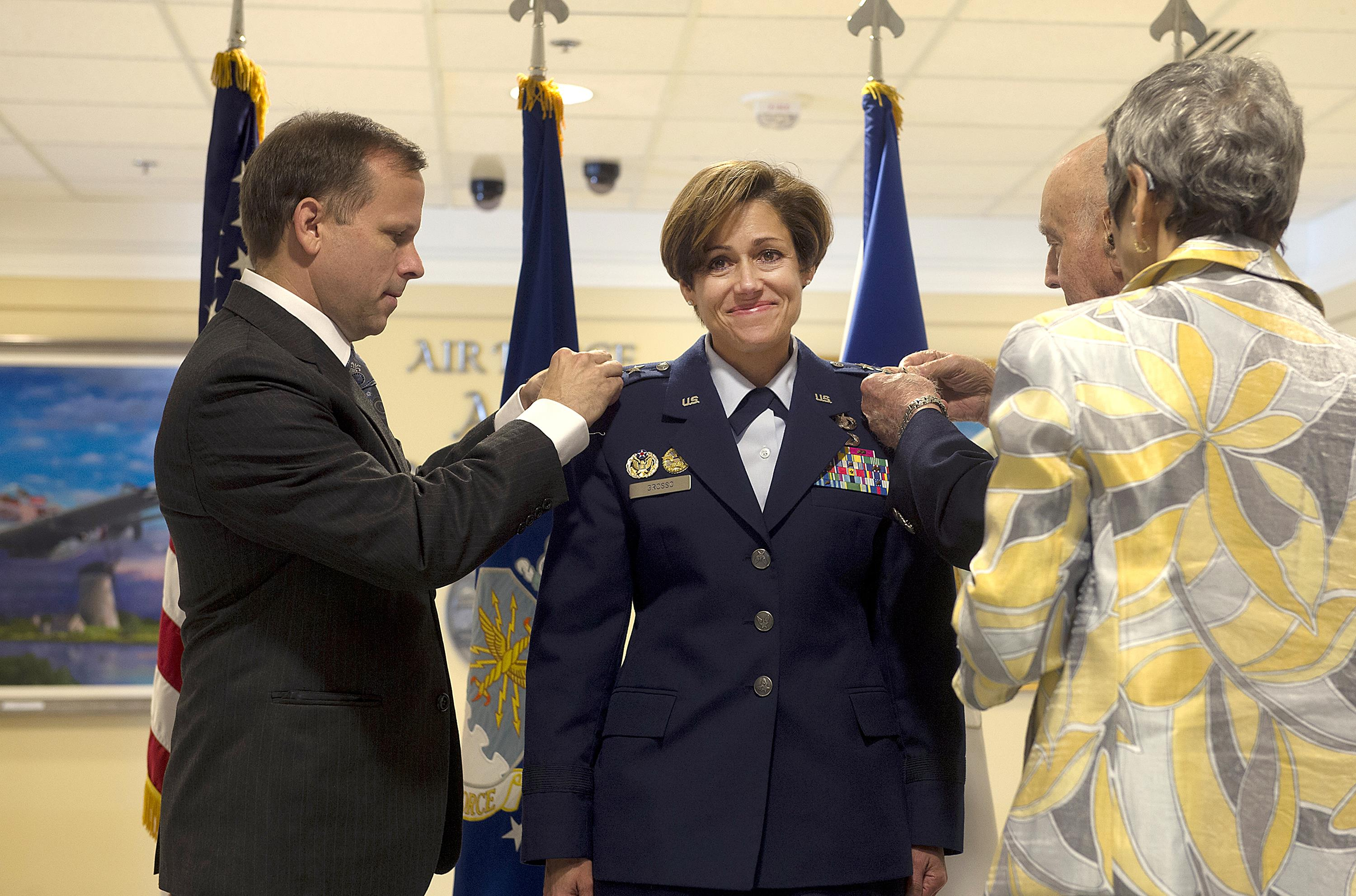
Retired Air Force Col. Brian O'Connor, Dr. Camille Grosso, and retired Air Force Lt. Col. Gerry Grosso help pin Lt. Gen. Gina Grosso's new rank during her promotion ceremony in the Pentagon Nov. 16, 2015.

- 1982 Annandale High School, Annandale, Va.
- 1986 Bachelor of Science, Applied Mathematics and Industrial Management, Carnegie-Mellon University, Pittsburgh, Pa.
- 1992 Master of Business Administration, College of William and Mary, Williamsburg, Va.
- 1993 Squadron Officer School, Maxwell AFB, Ala.
- 1997 Air Command and Staff College, Seminar
- 1999 Master's degree in national security and strategic studies, Naval Command and Staff College, Newport, R.I.
- 2000 Air War College, Seminar
- 2004 Fellow, Weatherhead Center for International Affairs, Harvard University, Boston, Mass.

== Military assignments ==
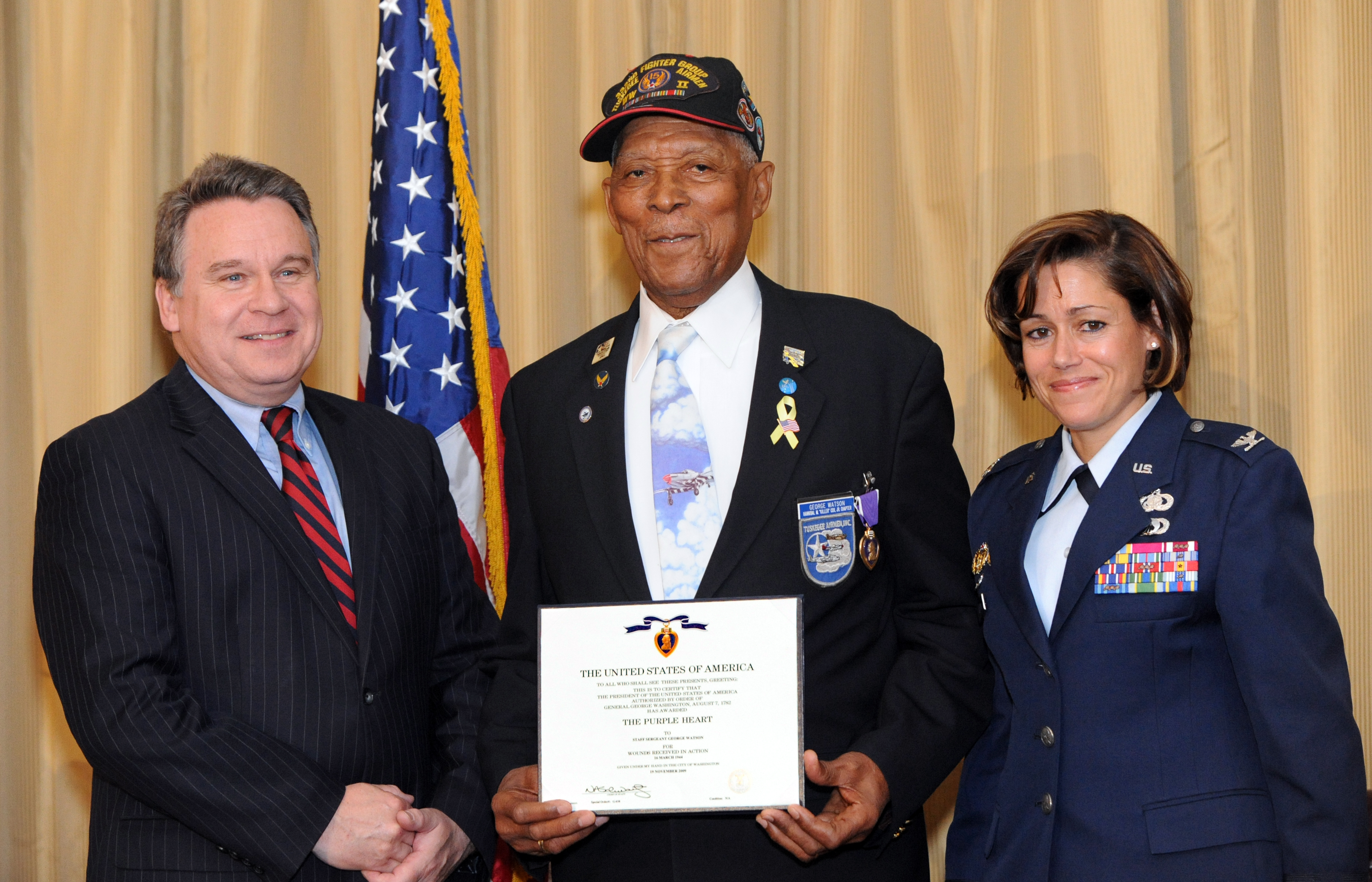
Congressman Christopher Smith presented the Purple Heart Medal to Tuskegee Airman Tech. Sgt. (Ret.) George Watson Sr. with then Col. Gina M. Grosso, Joint Base McGuire-Dix-Lakehurst commander in 2010

1. October 1986 - October 1988, Operations Analyst, followed by Commander, Headquarters Squadron Section, 554th Range Group, Nellis AFB, Nev.
2. November 1988 - April 1992, Personnel Programs and Force Programs Analyst, Deputy Chief of Staff, Personnel, Headquarters Tactical Air Command, Langley AFB, Va.
3. May 1992 - May 1993, Executive Officer, Directorate of Personnel, Headquarters Air Combat Command, Langley AFB, Va.
4. May 1993 - July 1993, Student, Squadron Officer School, Maxwell AFB, Ala.
5. August 1993 - May 1995, Commander, Military Personnel Flight, 6th Mission Support Squadron, MacDill AFB, Fla.
6. June 1995 - January 1997, Chief, Personnel Policy, followed by Deputy Chief, Support Division, Air Force Colonel Matters Office, Pentagon, Washington D.C.
7. January 1997 - July 1998, Member, Chief of Staff of the Air Force Operations Group, Headquarters Air Force, Pentagon, Washington D.C.
8. July 1998 - July 1999, Student, Naval Command and Staff College, Newport, R.I.
9. July 1999 - July 2001, Commander, 51st Mission Support Squadron, Osan Air Base, South Korea
10. July 2001 - May 2002, assistant director, Enlisted Plans and Policy, Office of the Secretary of Defense, the Pentagon, Washington D.C.
11. May 2002 - July 2003, Military Assistant, Deputy Under Secretary of Defense for Military Personnel Policy, Pentagon, Washington D.C.
12. July 2003 - July 2004, Fellow, Weatherhead Center for International Affairs, Harvard University, Boston, Mass.
13. July 2004 - July 2006, Commander, 737th Training Group, 37th Training Wing, Lackland AFB, Texas
14. July 2006 - July 2007, Director, Manpower and Personnel, Headquarters Pacific Air Forces, Hickam AFB, Hawaii
15. July 2007 - March 2009, Director, Air Force Colonels Management Office, the Pentagon, Washington D.C.
16. March 2009 - June 2011, Commander, Joint Base and 87th Air Base Wing, Joint Base McGuire-Dix-Lakehurst, N.J.
17. June 2011 - August 2012, Director, Manpower, Organization and Resources, the Pentagon, Washington D.C.
18. August 2012 - January 2014, Director, Force Management Policy, the Pentagon, Washington D.C.
19. February 2014 - October 2015, Director, Air Force Sexual Assault Prevention and Response Office, Office of the Vice Chief of Staff, Headquarters U.S. Air Force, Washington, D.C.
20. October 2015 - September 2018, Deputy Chief of Staff, Manpower, Personnel and Services, Headquarters U.S. Air Force, Washington D.C.

== Awards and decorations ==
Her major awards and decorations include:

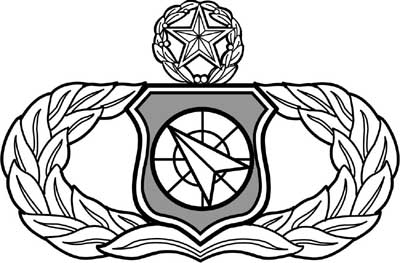
Air Force Master Force Support Badge (Officer)
Air Force Basic Acquisition and Financial Management Badge
Office of the Secretary of Defense Identification Badge
Headquarters Air Force Badge

Defense Superior Service Medal
Legion of Merit with two bronze oak leaf clusters
Meritorious Service Medal with three oak leaf clusters
Air Force Commendation Medal
Army Commendation Medal
Joint Service Achievement Medal
Air Force Achievement Medal with oak leaf cluster
Air Force Outstanding Unit Award with two oak leaf clusters
Air Force Organizational Excellence Award with three oak leaf clusters
National Defense Service Medal with one bronze service star
Global War on Terrorism Service Medal
Korea Defense Service Medal
Humanitarian Service Medal
Air Force Overseas Short Tour Service Ribbon with oak leaf cluster
Air Force Longevity Service Award with one silver and one bronze oak leaf clusters
Small Arms Expert Marksmanship Ribbon
Air Force Training Ribbon

== Promotion history ==
- Second Lieutenant Oct. 2, 1986
- First Lieutenant July 17, 1988
- Captain July 17, 1990
- Major Aug. 1, 1996
- Lieutenant Colonel July 1, 1999
- Colonel Aug. 1, 2003
- Brigadier General April 1, 2011
- Major General July 24, 2014
- Lieutenant General Oct. 15, 2015

Military offices
Preceded by Philip M. Ruhlman	Director of Manpower, Organization and Resources of the United States Air Force; 2011–2012	Succeeded by David B. Béen
Preceded by Sharon K.G. Dunbar	Director of Force Management Policy of the United States Air Force; 2012–2014	Succeeded by Brian T. Kelly
Preceded by Margaret H. Woodward	Director of the Air Force Sexual Assault Prevention and Response Office; 2014–2015	Succeeded by James C. Johnson
Preceded by Samuel D. Cox	Deputy Chief of Staff for Manpower, Personnel and Services of the United States Air Force; 2015–2018	Succeeded by Brian T. Kelly
