= 32nd Air Refueling Squadron =

US Air Force unit

32nd Air Refueling Squadron

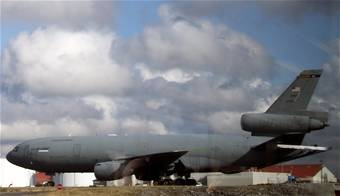
- KC-10A Extender from Joint Base McGuire-Dix-Lakehurst taxiing at Nashville International Airport
- Active: 1917–1919; 1932–1945; 1946–1964; 1964–1979; 1981-present
- Country: United States
- Branch: United States Air Force
- Role: Aerial refueling
- Part of: Air Mobility Command
- Garrison/HQ: Joint Base McGuire-Dix-Lakehurst
- Motto: Linking the Continents (1966-present)
- Engagements: World War I; Occupation of the Rhineland; World War II - American Campaign (Antisubmarine); World War II - EAME Theater; 1991 Gulf War (Defense of Saudi Arabia; Liberation of Kuwait); Kosovo Campaign; Iraq Campaign

- Decorations: Distinguished Unit Citation (2x); Air Force Outstanding Unit Award (15x)

Insignia
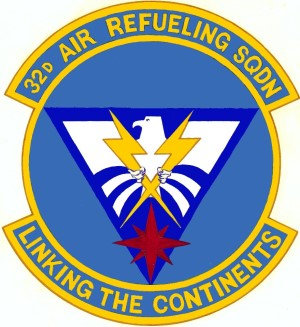
- 32nd Air Refueling Squadron emblem (Note: Approved 27 September 1994. Description: Celeste, on an equilateral triangle one point to base Azure a stylized eagle Argent grasping two lightning flashes saltirewise Or surmounted in base by a compass rose as a mullet of eight Gules, all within a diminished bordure of the fourth [color mentioned].)

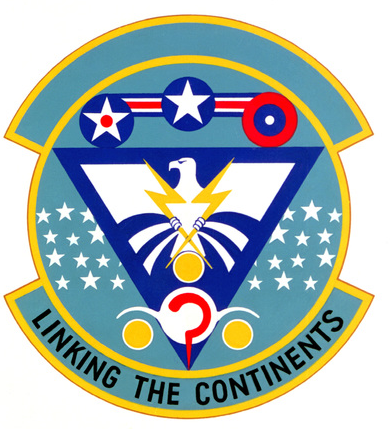
- 32nd Air Refueling Squadron emblem (Note: Approved 23 August 1982.)

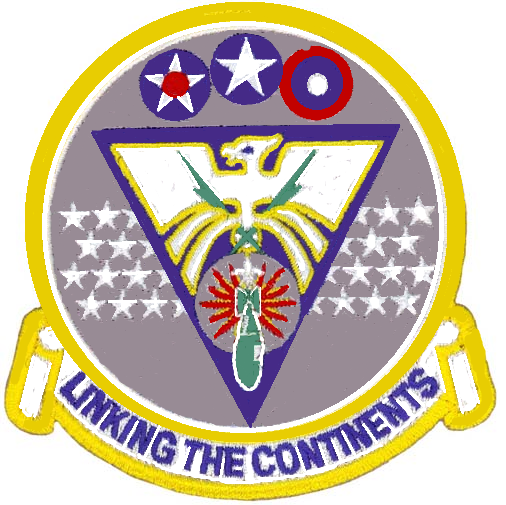
- 32nd Air Refueling Squadron emblem (Note: Approved 9 August 1966.)

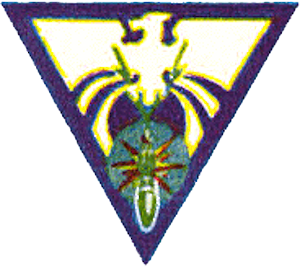
- 32nd Bombardment Squadron emblem (Note: Approved 21 November 1936. Description: On a dark blue equilateral triangle, one point down, a conventionalized fowl, white outlined with yellow, grasping two green lightning bolts which cross below the fowl and behind a yellow compass rose surmounted by a green drop bomb outlined with white.)

The 32nd Air Refueling Squadron (Note: Officially, 32d Air Refueling Squadron.) is a United States Air Force unit that is part of the 305th Air Mobility Wing at Joint Base McGuire-Dix-Lakehurst, New Jersey. It operates the Boeing KC-46A Pegasus aircraft conducting air refueling missions. The squadron is one of the oldest in the United States Air Force, its origins dating to 19 May 1917, being organized at Camp Kelly, Texas. The squadron deployed to England as part of the American Expeditionary Force during World War I. During World War II, the squadron saw combat service as a Boeing B-17 Flying Fortress unit, assigned to the Fifteenth Air Force in Italy. During the early years of the Cold War, it was a Boeing RB-47 Stratojet strategic reconnaissance squadron as part of Strategic Air Command.

== History ==
=== World War I ===
The squadron's origins date to 19 May 1917, about a month after the United States' entry into World War I. On that date a group of recruits were organized at Camp Kelly (later Kelly Field), Texas under the title of the Second Provisional Company F. That was later changed to First Provisional Company E. At Kelly Field, the new army recruits received basic military indoctrination by having drill in the mornings, then spending the balance of each day in the construction of facilities at the new camp, building roads, barracks and aircraft hangars in the afternoons. On 30 June the company was given the permanent designation of the 32d Aero Squadron.

On 11 August, orders were received for the 32d to deploy to France. The 30th to 37th Aero Squadrons were sent as a group to Fort Totten, New York, and embarked on the RMS Baltic on 23 August for their trans-Atlantic voyage. They arrived on 15 September at Liverpool, England, where 50 men of the group were selected to remain to train for aircraft mechanic instruction with the Royal Air Force. The balance of the squadron were ordered to Le Havre, France, arriving on 18 September. There most of the men of the group were sent to various French aviation schools for training to maintain French aircraft. The remainder of the group was designated as the 32d Aero Squadron and sent to the new Issoudun Aerodrome in central France. There the squadron was engaged in construction activities, building roads, barracks and hangars for what was designated as the 3d Air Instructional Center.

The 32d Aero Squadron remained at Issoudun Aerodrome for the balance of the war, engaging in construction activities at the facility as it grew and expanded. By the end of the war, the complex had grown to fifteen different airfields, all with support buildings and facilities. In November 1918, the 32d was reassigned to the Third Army Air Service, being moved to Trier Airdrome, in the Rhineland of Germany to repair the facility for use by the Air Service. In early January 1919, orders for demobilization were received and the squadron moved to a Base Port at Bordeaux, France for the return voyage back to the United States. It remained at the base camp until March, when it finally sailed for New York, arriving at Mitchel Field about 5 April. There the men of the 32d Aero Squadron were demobilized and returned to civilian life. The squadron was itself demobilized formally on 14 April 1919.

=== Inter-war years ===
The squadron was reconstituted in the Army Air Service as the 32d Bombardment Squadron on 24 March 1923. It was assigned to the 7th Bombardment Group. however it was not organized or activated until 24 June 1932 when it was assigned to the 19th Bombardment Group at Rockwell Field, San Diego, California. The 32d was equipped with Keystone B-3 bombers. It was moved in 1935 along with the group to the new March Field, near Riverside, where it received a mix of Martin B-10 and B-12 monoplane bombers.

In the late 1930s, the 32d received Douglas B-18 Bolo medium and early model YB-17 Flying Fortress heavy bombers. In 1940, it received the new B-17B Flying Fortress, the first production version of the B-17. The squadron was reassigned to Albuquerque Army Air Base, New Mexico on 4 June 1941. Its purpose was to train air and ground crews for reconnaissance and bombing duty with the B-17 before deployment to Clark Field in the Philippine Islands. On 23 November it moved to Hamilton Field, California to stage for its subsequent movement to Clark Field. It was at Hamilton Field on 7 December 1941 during the Pearl Harbor Attack. The ground echelon departed San Francisco aboard ship on 6 December 1941, but returned on 9 December 1941.

=== World War II ===
The day following the Pearl Harbor Attack, the 32d moved to Muroc Army Air Field, performing antisubmarine patrols along the Southern California coast. On 16 December it was attached to the provisional Sierra Bombardment Group. However, as conditions in the Philippines worsened, the air echelon's B-17s departed via Hawaii on 17 December. Upon arrival at Hickam Field, the aircraft were pressed into service for defensive reconnaissance patrols around the Hawaiian Islands. The personnel of the ground echelon at Muroc were assigned to other units, although the unit remained active.

The squadron was reformed at Geiger Field, Washington in March 1942, by the transfer of the personnel and equipment of the 354th Bombardment Squadron, which was disbanded, becoming part of the 301st Bombardment Group. It moved to Alamogordo Army Air Field, New Mexico in May, but the air echelon returned to Muroc and again flew antisubmarine patrols off the California coast from late May to early June 1942.

The ground echelon moved to Virginia to prepare for movement overseas, leaving for Fort Dix and the Port of Embarkation on 19 July. The air echelon left for Brainard Field, Connecticut in late June. The squadron ferried its Flying Fortresses via the North Atlantic ferry route as part of Operation Bolero, the build up of American forces in the United Kingdom. The squadron and its companion squadrons of the 301st Group were the first B-17F unit to arrive in England. (Note: The 97th Bombardment Group had arrived earlier, but was equipped with B-17Es. Freeman, p. 13.)

==== Operations from England ====
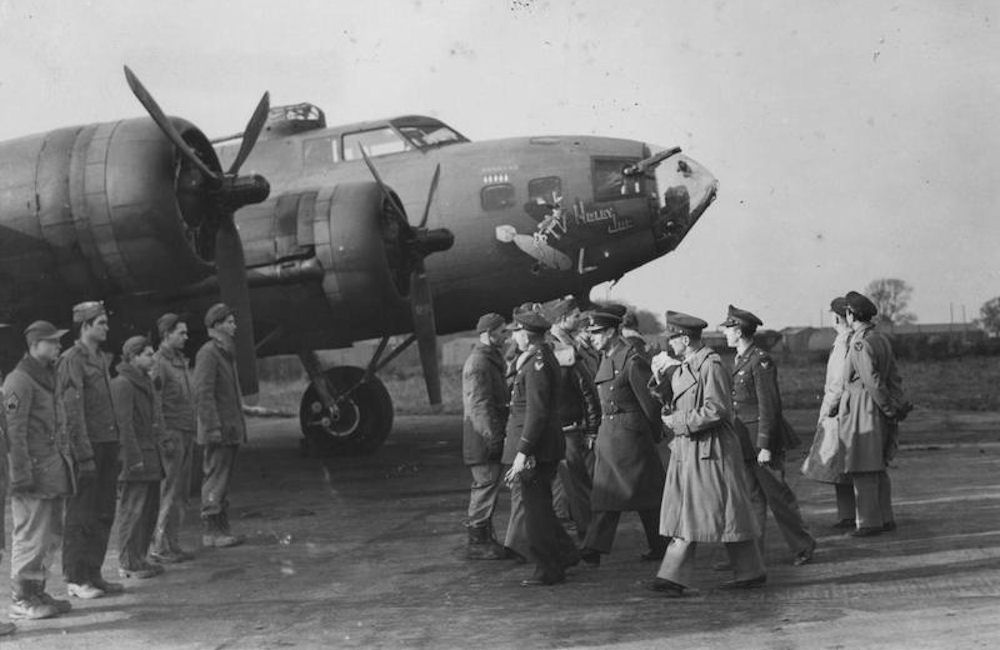
King George VI visiting the 301st Bombardment Group in 1942. (Note: The aircraft in the background is Boeing B-17F-1-BO Flying Fortress, serial 41-24352. This plane suffered severe battle damage on a mission to steel works at Lille, France (Although located in the Lille metropolitan area, the target was actually in Belgium, on the left bank of the Deûle River.) on 9 October 1942. The crew prepared to bail out but the bomber made it back to Chelveston with one engine on fire, two propellers feathered and a couple of hundred holes in it. Following this mission, it was named Holey Joe.)

The ground and air echelons were reunited at RAF Chelveston on 19 August 1942. The squadron flew its first mission on 5 September 1942. From England it attacked targets primarily in France, including submarine pens, airfields, railroad targets, and bridges. On 14 September, the 301st Group and its squadrons were reassigned to XII Bomber Command in preparation for Operation Torch, the invasion of North Africa, but they continued to operate under the control of VIII Bomber Command. Between 20 and 23 November 1942, the air echelon moved forward to bases in southeastern England, from which it flew directly to Tafaraoui Airfield, Algeria. The ground echelon sailed for Algeria from Liverpool on 8 December 1942.

==== Combat in the Mediterranean ====
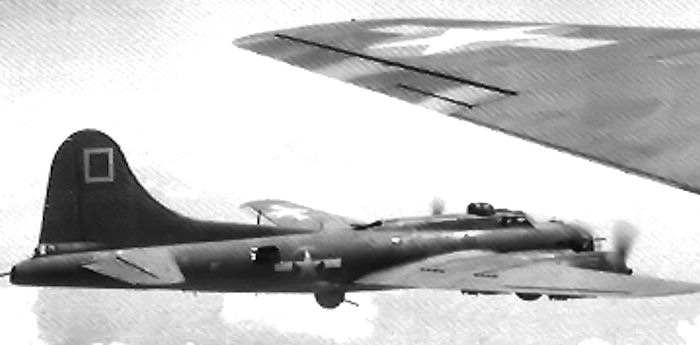
Squadron B-17F enroute to Viterbo Airfield, Italy on 29 July 1943 (Note: The aircraft is Boeing B-17F-35-BO Flying Fortress, serial 42-5145, The Gremlin. Assigned to the group seven months earlier, this aircraft had completed 62 missions by the time it was transferred on to the 86th Bombardment Squadron in November 1943. It was lost on its 102nd combat sortie when it was shot down by German fighters on a mission to Padua, Italy, on 11 March 1944. Six crewmen bailed out. Baugher, Joe (2 June 2023). "1942 USAF Serial Numbers". Joe Baugher. Missing Air Crew Report 2836.)

Until August 1943, the squadron operated from airfields in Algeria, bombing docks, shipping facilities, airfields and marshalling yards in Tunisia, Sicily, and Sardinia. It also attacked enemy ships operating between Sicily and Tunisia. On 6 April 1943, the squadron withstood heavy flak from shore defenses and enemy vessels, when it attacked a merchant convoy near Bizerte, Tunisia carrying supplies essential for the Axis defense of Tunisia. For this mission it was awarded the Distinguished Unit Citation (DUC). In May and June, it participated in Operation Corkscrew, the bombing and invasion of Pantelleria, prior to the invasion of Sicily.

Starting in July 1943, the squadron began flying numerous missions to targets in Italy, moving forward to Oudna Airfield, Tunisia in early August. In November 1943, strategic and tactical forces in the Mediterranean were divided and the squadron became part of Fifteenth Air Force. It moved to Italy in December 1943 and in February 1944 it was established at Lucera Airfield, Italy, from which it would conduct combat operations for the remainder of the war. From its Italian base, it concentrated on the strategic bombing campaign against Germany, attacking oil centers, lines of communications, and industrial areas in Austria, Bulgaria, Czechoslovakia, France, Germany, Greece, Hungary, Italy, Poland, Romania, and Yugoslavia. On 23 February 1944, it participated in an attack on the Messerschmitt aircraft factory at Regensburg, succeeding despite "viscous" attacks by enemy interceptors. For this mission, it was awarded a second DUC.

The 32nd also flew air support missions near Anzio and Monte Cassino, provided cover for Operation Dragoon, the invasion of southern France and the advance of the Red Army in the Balkans and the Allies of World War II advances in the Po Valley. It engaged in shuttle bombing missions to airfields in the Soviet Union during the summer of 1944.

==== Return to the United States ====
Following V-E Day, the squadron remained in Italy until July 1945. In August, it was designated as a "very heavy" unit in preparation for conversion to the Boeing B-29 Superfortress and deployment to Pacific Theater. Before the squadron arrived at its planned training base, Pyote Army Air Field, Texas, Japan had surrendered and there was no need for additional bomber units. The squadron was inactivated in October 1945, shortly before Pyote ended training operations and became an aircraft storage depot.

=== Cold War ===
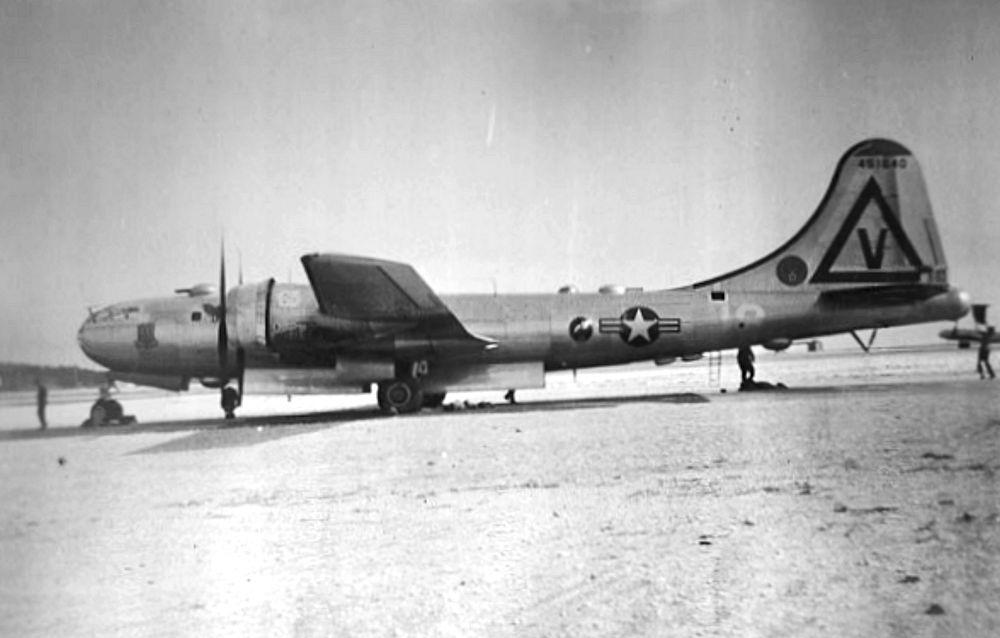
301st Bombardment Group B-29 Superfortress (Note: Aircraft is Boeing B-29A-40-BN Superfortress, serial 44-61640. It was later converted to WB-29 weather reconnaissance configuration and was lost on 26 February 1952. Baugher, Joe (9 October 2023). "1944 USAF Serial Numbers". Joe Baugher.)

On 4 August 1946, the 788th Bombardment Squadron at Smoky Hill Army Air Field was inactivated and its mission, personnel and equipment were transferred to the 32d Bombardment Squadron, which was simultaneously activated. It was deployed to Furstenfeldbruck Air Base, Germany, from July to August 1948; to RAF Scampton, England, from October 1948 until January 1949; and to RAF Lakenheath and RAF Sculthorpe, from May to November 1950 for "show of force" missions in Europe as a result of the Berlin Blockade by the Soviet Union and rising Cold War tensions in Europe.

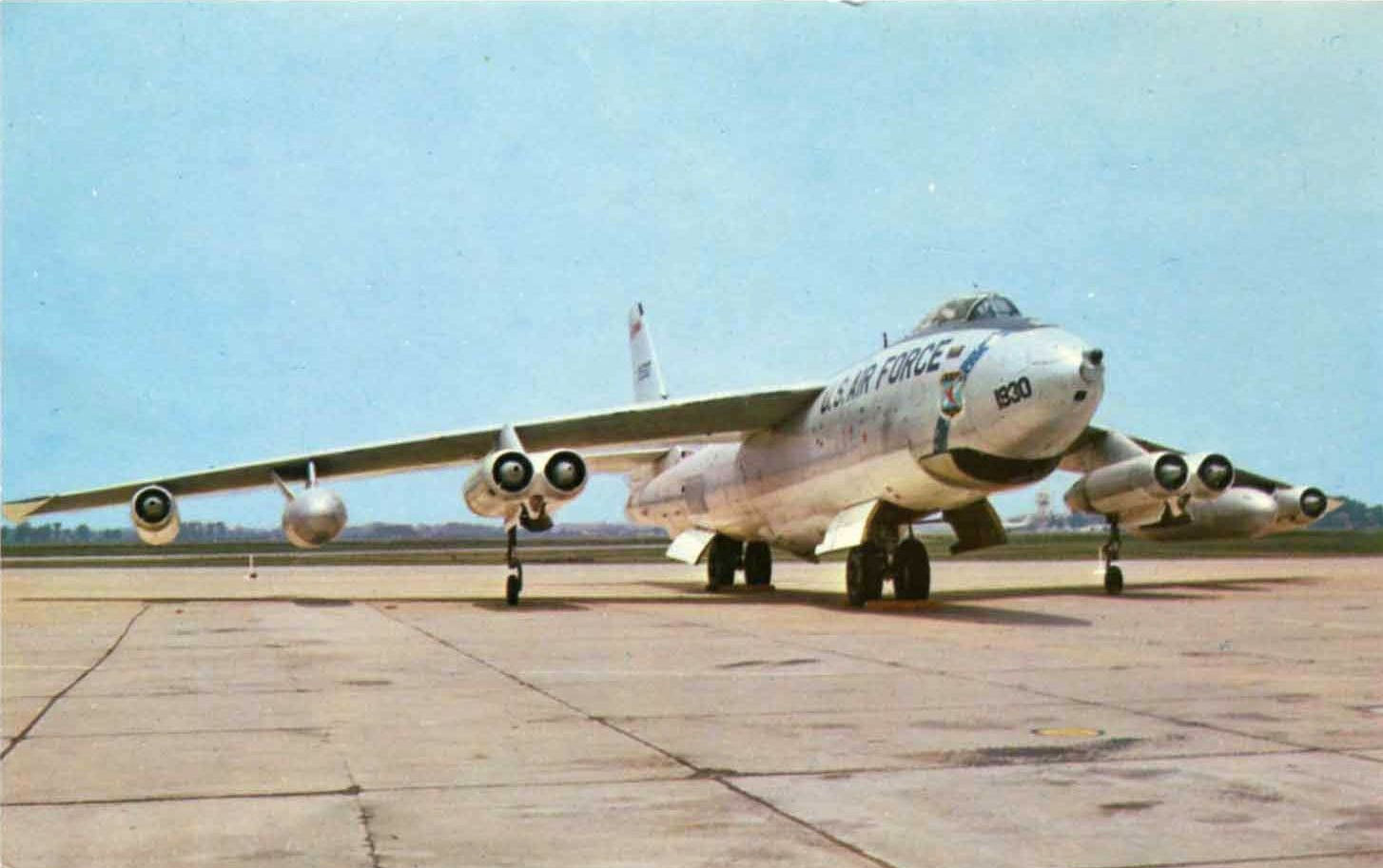
301st Bombardment Wing B-47 (Note: Aircraft is Lockheed Aircraft manufactured Boeing B-47E-55-LM Stratojet, serial 53-1830 parked at Langley Air Force Base in 1960. This plane was sent to the Military Aircraft Storage and Disposition Center on 18 January 1963 and scrapped on 30 October 1967. Baugher, Joe (5 August 2023). "1953 USAF Serial Numbers". Joe Baugher.)

The squadron was equipped in 1953 with Boeing B-47 Stratojets, and trained with electronic countermeasures from 1958 until 1964.

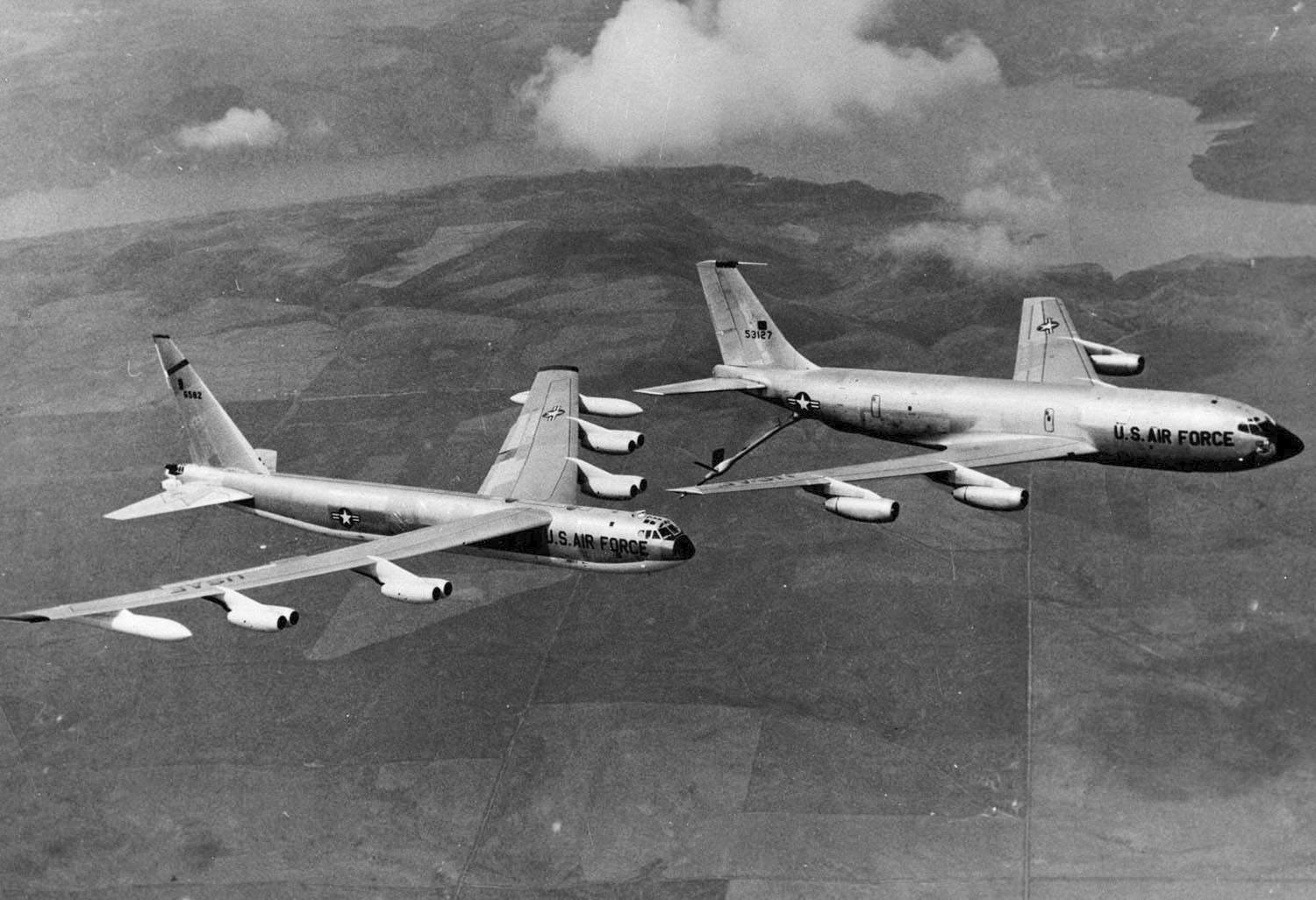
B-52D being refueled by KC-135A

In 1965 the squadron was redesignated 32d Air Refueling Squadron and assumed the mission, personnel and equipment of the 321st Air Refueling Squadron, which was simultaneously inactivated, at Lockbourne Air Force Base. The unit performed air refueling operations worldwide from 1965–1979 and since 1981. From c. 10 June–8 October 1972, all personnel and aircraft were on loan to units in the Pacific or other Strategic Air Command units, leaving the squadron unmanned. It deployed most aircraft and personnel to Southeast Asia October–December 1972, in support of Operation Linebacker II. It again deployed aircrews and tankers to various locations for air refueling support in Southwest Asia from August 1990–April 1991.

=== Modern era ===
The 32d received the first McDonnell Douglas KC-10 Extender delivered to the Air Force, at Barksdale Air Force Base, Louisiana on 17 March 1981.

== Lineage ==
- Organized as the 32d Aero Squadron on 13 June 1917

Demobilized on 14 April 1919
Reconstituted and redesignated 32d Bombardment Squadron on 24 March 1923
Activated on 24 June 1932
Redesignated 32d Bombardment Squadron (Heavy) on 6 December 1939
Redesignated 32d Bombardment Squadron, Heavy c. 6 March 1944
Redesignated 32d Bombardment Squadron, Very Heavy on 5 August 1945
Inactivated on 15 October 1945
Activated on 4 August 1946
Redesignated 32d Bombardment Squadron, Medium on 28 May 1948
Discontinued and inactivated, on 8 June 1964
Redesignated 32d Air Refueling Squadron, Heavy and activated on 23 December 1964 (not organized) (Note: The squadron is not related to a 32d Air Refueling Squadron, Heavy that was constituted the same day and assigned to Strategic Air Command for activation on or about 8 March 1965. This action was retroactively revoked in November 1965 and the 32d Bombardment Squadron was redesignated as the 32d Air Refueling Squadron. AFOMO Letter 346n, 23 December 1964, Subject: Activation of the 32d Air Refueling Squadron, Heavy and Certain Other USAF Unit Actions; AFOMO Letter 481n, Subject: Amendment to AFOMO Letter 346n, 23 Nov 1965.)
Organized on 15 March 1965
Inactivated on 30 September 1979
Activated on 1 November 1981
Redesignated 32d Air Refueling Squadron on 1 September 1991

=== Assignments ===
- Unknown, 13 June–September 1917 (Note: Probably Post Headquarters, Camp Kelly.)
- Third Aviation Instruction Center, September 1917 – January 1919
- Unknown, January–14 April 1919
- 19th Bombardment Group, 24 June 1932 (attached to IV Bomber Command, 22 October–December 1941, apparently attached to 7th Bombardment Group for operations, c. 8–15 December 1941)
- Sierra Bombardment Group, 16 December 1941
- Fourth Air Force, 17 January 1942
- Second Air Force, 16 March 1942 (attached to 301st Bombardment Group, 16–30 March 1942)
- 301st Bombardment Group, 31 March 1942 – 15 October 1945
- 301st Bombardment Group, 4 August 1946 (attached to 301st Bombardment Wing after 10 February 1951)
- 301st Bombardment Wing, 16 June 1952 – 8 June 1964
- Strategic Air Command, 23 December 1964 (not organized)
- 301st Air Refueling Wing, 15 March 1965 – 30 September 1979
- 2nd Bombardment Wing, 1 November 1981
- 2nd Operations Group, 1 September 1991
- 458th Operations Group, 1 June 1992
- 305th Operations Group, 1 July 1995 – present

=== Stations ===
- Camp Kelly, Texas 13 June-11 August 1917
- Étampes, France 20 September 1917
- Issoudun Aerodrome, France 28 September 1917
- Bordeaux, France c. 6 January-c. 18 March 1919
- Mitchel Field, New York c. 5–14 April 1919
- Rockwell Field, California 24 June 1932
- March Field, California 25 October 1935
- Army Air Base, Albuquerque, New Mexico c. 4 June-22 November 1941
- Army Air Base, Bakersfield, California 17 December 1941
- Geiger Field, Washington, c. 14 March 1942
- Alamogordo Army Air Field, New Mexico 27 May 1942 (operated from Muroc Army Air Field, California c. 28 May - 14 June 1942)
- Richard E. Byrd Field, Virginia 21 June-19 July 1942
- RAF Chelveston, (Station 105), England 18 August 1942
- Tafaraoui Airfield, Algeria 26 November 1942
- Maison Blanche Airport, Algeria, 6 December 1942
- Biskra Airfield, Algeria 16 December 1942
- Ain M'lila Airfield, Algeria 16 January 1943
- Saint-Donat Airfield, Algeria 8 March 1943
- Oudna Airfield, Tunisia 6 August 1943
- Cerignola Airfield, Italy 11 December 1943
- Lucera Airfield, Italy 2 February 1944-July 1945
- Sioux Falls Army Air Field, South Dakota 28 July 1945
- Mountain Home Army Air Field, Idaho 17 August 1945
- Pyote Army Air Field, Texas 23 August-15 October 1945
- Clovis Army Air Field, New Mexico 4 August 1946
- Smoky Hill Army Air Field (later Smoky Hill Air Force Base), Kansas 16 July 1947
- Barksdale Air Force Base, Louisiana 7 November 1949 (deployed to RAF Lakenheath, England 16 May - 1 December 1950; RAF Brize Norton, England 8 December 1952 – 6 March 1953; Sidi Slimane Air Base, French Morocco 14 February - 15 April 1954)
- Lockbourne Air Force Base (later Rickenbacker Air Force Base), Ohio 15 March 1965 – 30 September 1979
- Barksdale Air Force Base, Louisiana 1 November 1981
- McGuire Air Force Base (later Joint Base McGuire-Dix-Lakehurst), New Jersey 1 September 1994 – present

=== Aircraft ===
- Douglas C-26 Dolphin (1932–1935)
- Fokker O-27 (1932–1935)
- Martin B-12 (1932–1935)
- Keystone B-3 (1932–1935)
- Martin B-10 (1935–1941)
- Douglas B-18 Bolo (1935–1941)
- Boeing B-17 Flying Fortress (1935–1941, 1942–1945)
- Boeing B-29 Superfortress (1947–1953)
- Boeing B-47 Stratojet (1953–1961, 1963–1964)
- Boeing RB-47 Stratojet (1958)
- Boeing EB-47 Stratojet (1961–1964)
- Boeing EC-135 (1965–1966)
- Boeing KC-135 Stratotanker (1965–1979)
- McDonnell Douglas KC-10 Extender (1981–present)

== See also ==
- List of American Aero Squadrons
- Boeing B-17 Flying Fortress Units of the Mediterranean Theater of Operations
