= Brian T. Kelly =

US Air Force Lieutenant general

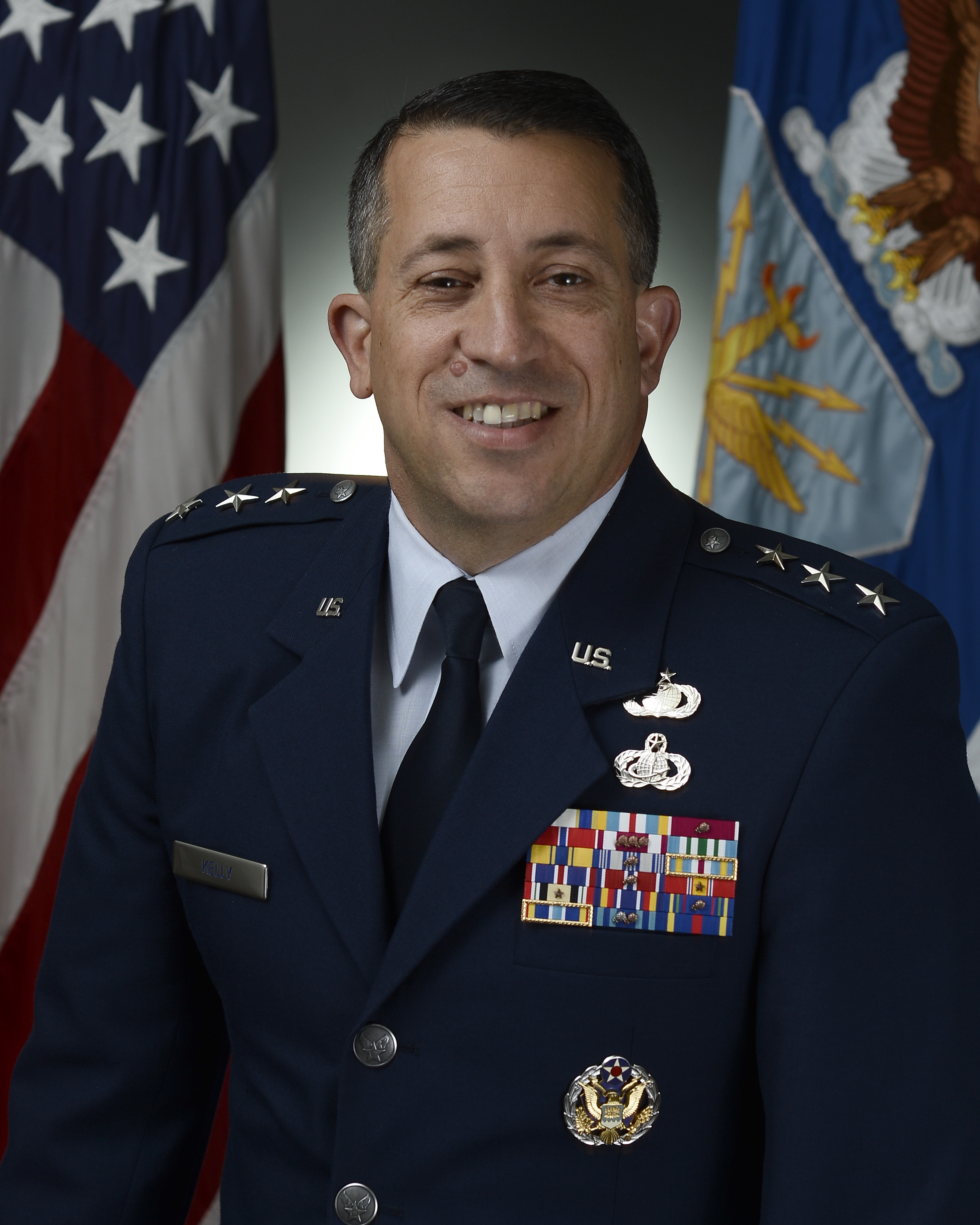
- Military career
- Allegiance: United States
- Branch: United States Air Force
- Service years: 1988–2022
- Rank: Lieutenant General
- Commands: Air Force Personnel Center; 501st Combat Support Wing; 31st Mission Support Group; 92nd Mission Support Squadron
- Conflicts: Iraq War
- Awards: Air Force Distinguished Service Medal; Defense Superior Service Medal; Legion of Merit (2); Bronze Star Medal
- Brian T. Kelly's voice Kelly's opening statement at a House Armed Services Military Personnel Subcommittee hearing on talent management and reorganization Recorded February 8, 2022

Brian Thomas Kelly is a retired lieutenant general in the United States Air Force. He served as the Deputy Chief of Staff for Manpower, Personnel and Services (A1), a position he held from September 2018 to May 2022. Kelly was commissioned through the ROTC program at University of Notre Dame in 1988.

Raised in Piscataway, New Jersey, Kelly earned a Bachelor of Science degree in aerospace engineering. He later received a master's degree in Military Operational Art and Science from the Air Command and Staff College in 2001 and a Master of Science degree in National Resource Strategy from the Industrial College of the Armed Forces at the National Defense University in 2006.

== Effective dates of promotions ==
Rank	Date
Second Lieutenant	November 11, 1988
First Lieutenant	November 11, 1990
Captain	November 11, 1992
Major	August 1, 1998
Lieutenant Colonel	February 1, 2003
Colonel	September 1, 2007
Brigadier General	June 2, 2014
Major General	August 2, 2017
Lieutenant General	September 4, 2018

Military offices
Preceded by Timothy S. Cashdollar	Commander of the 501st Combat Support Wing; 2011–2013	Succeeded by Angela Cadwell
Preceded by Gina Grosso	Director of Military Force Management Policy of the United States Air Force; 2014–2017	Succeeded by Robert Labrutta
Preceded by Margaret B. Poore	Commander of the Air Force Personnel Center; 2017–2018	Succeeded by Andrew Toth
Preceded by Gina Grosso	Deputy Chief of Staff for Manpower, Personnel, and Services of the United States Air Force; 2018–2022	Succeeded by Gwendolyn DeFilippi; Acting
