= 346th Cyberspace Test & Evaluation Squadron =

346th Cyberspace Test & Evaluation Squadron ACC Shield

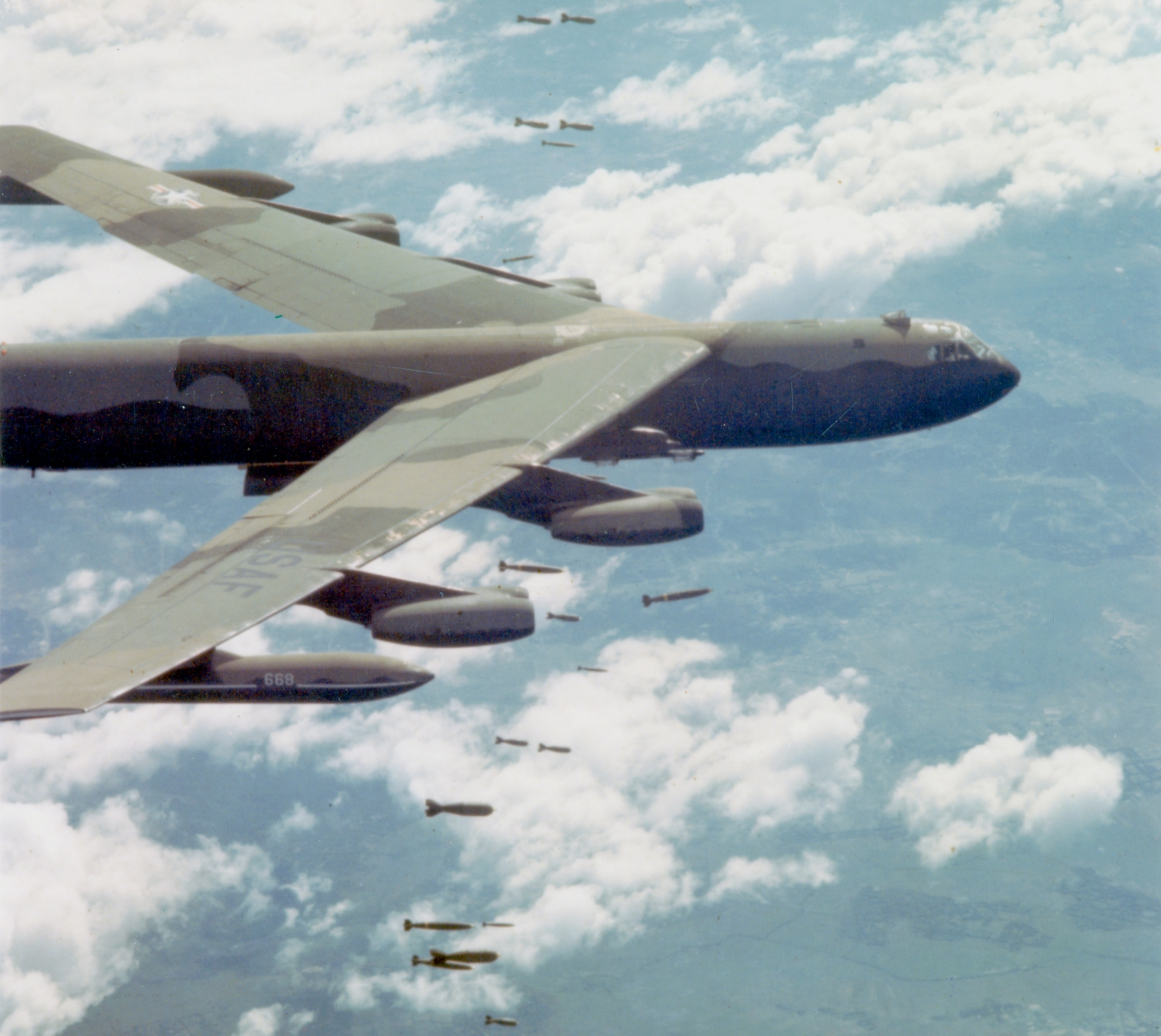
- A B-52D Stratofortress dropping bombs over Vietnam (Note: Aircraft is Boeing B-52D-35-BW Stratofortress serial 56-669. This plane was hit by a surface-to-air missile over North Viet Nam on 21 December 1972 during Operation Linebacker II and crashed in Laos. Baugher, Joe (19 May 2023). "1956 USAF Serial Numbers". Joe Baugher.)
- Active: 1942–1945; 1947–1949; 1953–1974; 1993–1995; 2000–present
- Country: United States
- Branch: United States Air Force
- Role: System testing
- Size: 120 personnel
- Part of: Air Combat Command
- Garrison/HQ: Joint Base San Antonio–Lackland
- Engagements: Mediterranean Theater of Operations
- Decorations: Distinguished Unit Citation; Air Force Outstanding Unit Award with Combat "V" Device; Air Force Outstanding Unit Award; Air Force Organizational Excellence Award; Vietnam Cross of Gallantry with Palm

Insignia
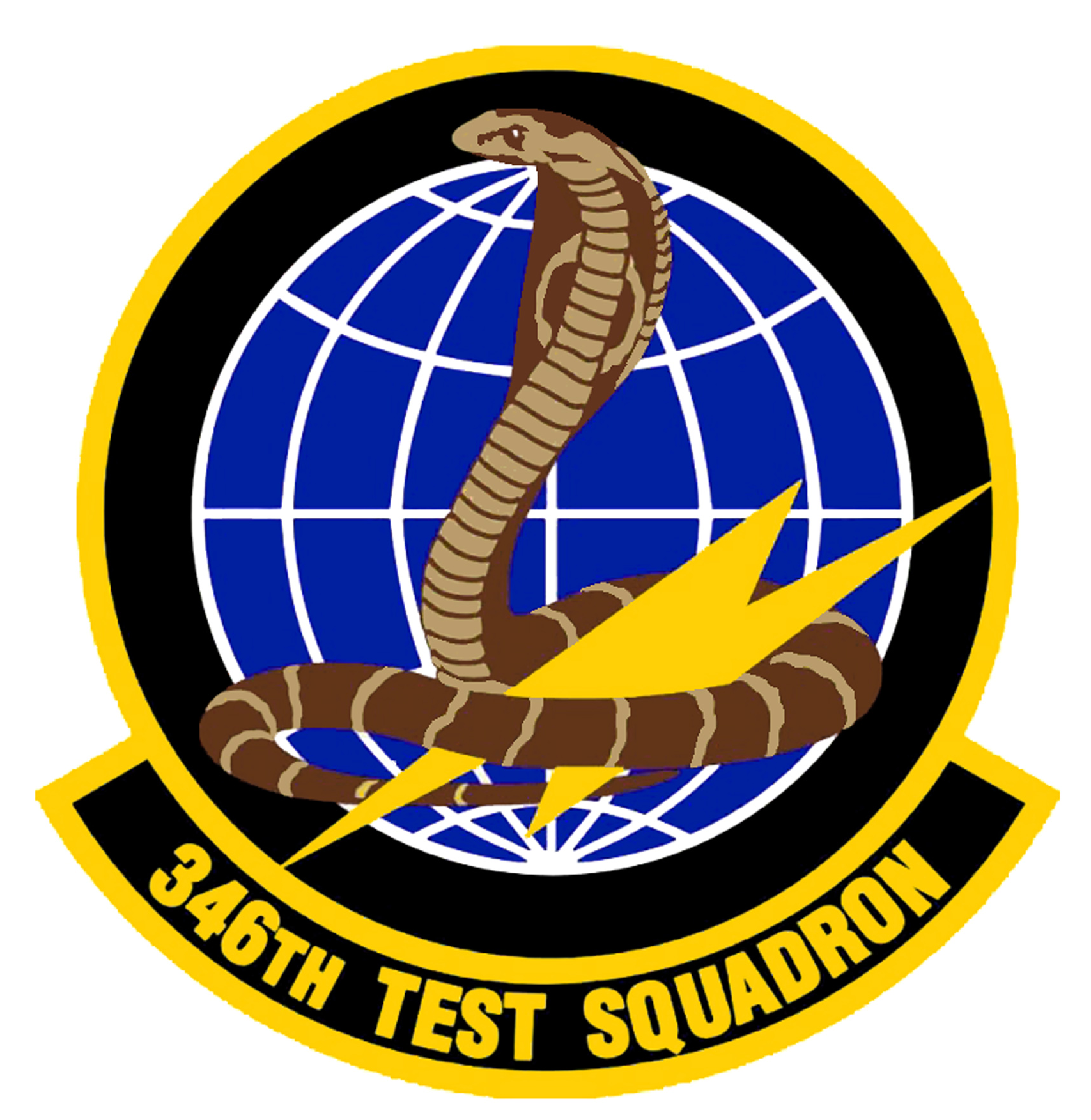
- 346th Test Squadron emblem (Note: Approved 7 November 2000.)

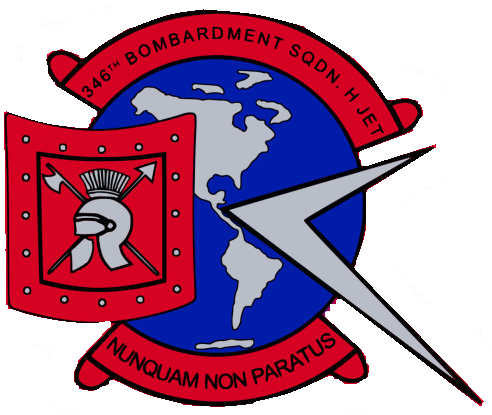
- 346th Bombardment Squadron emblem (Note: Approved c. 1963)

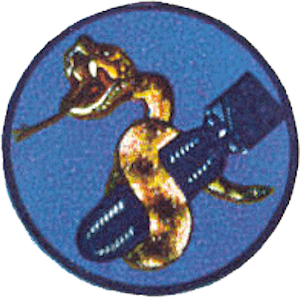
- 346th Bombardment Squadron emblem (Note: Approved 18 February 1944. Description: On a medium blue disc, border black, a rattlesnake in striking position, proper, tail entwined about large black aerial bomb, highlighted light blue and white, falling to dexter base.)

The 346th Cyberspace Test & Evaluation Squadron is a United States Air Force unit assigned to the 318th Cyberspace Operations Group at Joint Base San Antonio–Lackland, Texas. The squadron tests military cyberspace operation and information operations capabilities.

The squadron was first activated as the 346th Bombardment Squadron in 1942. After training in the United States, it moved to the Mediterranean Theater of Operations, where it earned two Distinguished Unit Citations in operations against the Axis powers. After V-E Day, the squadron remained in Italy until November 1945, when it was inactivated. The squadron was activated in the reserves from 1947 to 1949, but does not appear to have been fully manned or equipped.

In 1953, the squadron was activated as the 346th Strategic Reconnaissance Squadron as part of Strategic Air Command. It returned to the bombardment mission two years later, and served in this role until inactivating in 1974. Although the squadron remained in the United States except for one deployment in the 1950s, during the Vietnam War it deployed its aircrews and Boeing B-52 Stratofortresses to Southeast Asia. For extended periods, all squadron personnel and equipment were deployed.

The squadron was activated in 1993 as the 346th Test and Evaluation Squadron and performed operational testing and evaluation until inactivating in 1995. It was activated in its current role in 2000. The squadron was redesignated as the a Cyberspace Test & Evaluation Squadron on 28 February 2025.

== Mission ==
The squadron mission is to conduct independent operational tests and evaluations, emissions security tests, and other specialized tests of cyberspace capabilities. It operates Air Force Space Command’s cyber test & training range. The 346th's 120 personnel include 50 active duty airmen, 30 Department of Defense civilian employees and 40 contractors.

The 346th conducts operational tests for components of weapons systems, equipment, or software to determine its operational effectiveness and suitability. It identifies unexpected critical system performance issues that might affect system combat effectiveness before system fielding.

== History ==
=== World War II ===
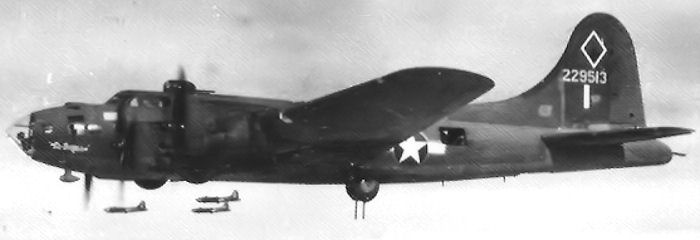
B-17F of the 346th Bombardment Squadron (Note: Aircraft is Boeing B-17F-55-BO Flying Fortress, serial 42-29513, El Diablo. It flew 121 combat missions (114 with the squadron) by 26 February 1944. It was then deemed "War Weary". It was stripped of its armament and converted into a weather ship for the 304th Bombardment Wing at Cerignola, Italy. It was salvaged on 23 August 1945. Baugher, Joe (8 September 2023). "1942 USAF Serial Numbers". Joe Baugher.)

The squadron was activated in June 1942 as the 346th Bombardment Squadron, one of the four original squadrons of the 99th Bombardment Group, at Orlando Army Air Base, Florida, moving on paper the same day to MacDill Field, Florida. However, the Army Air Forces had decided to concentrate all heavy bomber training under Second Air Force, and before the end of the month, the squadron moved to Pendleton Field, Oregon to begin its training in Boeing B-17 Flying Fortresses. It continued training with the B-17 until January 1943, when it began deploying to the Mediterranean Theater of Operations.

The squadron's ground echelon went by ship from New York City to Marrakesh, Morocco; the air echelon flew to Morrison Field, Florida, then along the South Atlantic Route. The ground and air echelons of the squadron were reunited at Navarin Airfield, Algeria in March 1943. It moved forward to Oudna Airfield, Tunisia after the Allies drove Axis forces from North Africa in May 1943. The squadron concentrated on targets such as airfields, harbor facilities, shipping, viaducts and bridges in North Africa, Sicily and Italy. In early June 1943, the squadron participated in Operation Corkscrew, the reduction of Pantelleria Island in preparation for the invasion of Sicily.

The squadron helped neutralize enemy fighter aircraft opposition to Operation Husky, the invasion of Sicily, penetrating enemy air defenses by bombing airplanes, hangars and fuel and ammunition storage sites at Gerbini Airfield. For these actions, it was awarded the Distinguished Unit Citation (DUC).

In November 1943, the 346th became part of Fifteenth Air Force, which focused on the strategic bombing campaign against Germany. The following month it moved to Tortorella Airfield, Italy. From this base, it engaged in the bombardment of enemy targets in Austria, Bulgaria, Czechoslovakia, France, Germany, Greece, Hungary, Italy, Romania, and Yugoslavia; attacking oil refineries, marshaling yards, aircraft factories, and other strategic objectives. On 23 April 1944, the squadron participated in an attack on aircraft factories in Wiener Neustadt, Austria, despite heavy enemy interceptor opposition. For this action, it was awarded a second DUC.

Following V-E Day, the squadron became part of the occupation forces in Italy, until inactivating in November 1945.

=== Air Force reserve ===
The squadron was activated under Air Defense Command (ADC) in the reserve at Birmingham Municipal Airport, Alabama, on 19 May 1947 and was again assigned to the 99th Group. Its training was supervised by ADC's 477th AAF Base Unit (later the 2587th Air Force Reserve Training Center). As the post war Air Force took shape, the National Guard was considered the first line of reserve. Reserve units like the 346th got what was left over after National Guard units received facilities, equipment and aircraft. Aircraft were allotted to reserve units as a means of maintaining flying proficiency, not combat readiness. Aircraft assigned to the reserves were overwhelmingly trainers, and no heavy bombers were ever assigned. The allotment of units to the reserves was made only for planning purposes and mobilization plans called for personnel assigned to the 346th to be called to active duty during mobilization as individuals, not as a unit.

In 1948 Continental Air Command (ConAC) assumed responsibility for managing reserve and National Guard units from ADC. President Truman’s reduced 1949 defense budget, however, required reductions in the number of units in the Air Force, ConAC also reorganized its reserve units under the Wing Base Organization, and the 19th Air Division and other reserve units at Birmingham Municipal Airport, including the squadron, were inactivated and replaced by the 514th Troop Carrier Wing in June 1949.

=== Strategic Air Command ===
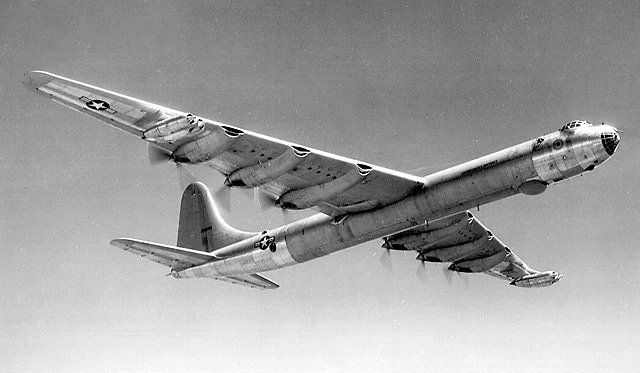
Convair B-36 Peacemaker

The squadron was redesignated the 346th Strategic Reconnaissance Squadron and activated in January 1953 at Fairchild Air Force Base, Washington when the 111th Strategic Reconnaissance Wing, an Air National Guard unit that had been mobilized for the Korean War, was returned to state control. The squadron assumed the mission, personnel, and Convair RB-36 Peacemaker strategic reconnaissance aircraft (Note: The 103d was converting to RB-36s from Boeing RB-29 Superfortresses.) of the 111th Wing's 103d Strategic Reconnaissance Squadron, which returned to the Maryland Air National Guard. On 16 June 1954 the squadron, along with SAC's other B-36 reconnaissance units was assigned bombing as its primary mission, although it continued to fly reconnaissance missions until September 1956. However, it retained its designation until October 1955, when it again became the 346th Bombardment Squadron.

In 1956, the squadron moved to Westover Air Force Base, Massachusetts, where it began upgrading to Boeing B-52 Stratofortress jet bombers. General Thomas S. Power set an initial goal of maintaining one third of SAC's planes on fifteen minute ground alert, fully fueled and ready for combat to reduce vulnerability to a Soviet missile strike. Eleven per cent of SAC’s bombers were on alert by the end of 1957. That number grew to 12 percent in 1958 and 20 percent by 1959. The command’s goal of one third was finally reached in 1960. In 1962, the number of the squadron's planes on alert was increased to one half. SAC planners were looking into methods to protect their forces in addition to the ground alert program as early as 1957. Tests under the name Operation Head Start were precursors to Operation Chrome Dome. In January 1961, SAC disclosed it was maintaining an airborne force for "airborne alert training."

Soon after detection of Soviet missiles in Cuba, all degraded and adjusted alert sorties were brought up to full capability. On 20 October the squadron was directed to put two additional planes on alert. On 22 October. 1/8 of SAC's B-52s were placed on airborne alert. On 24 October SAC went to DEFCON 2, placing all aircraft on alert. On 21 November SAC returned to normal airborne alert posture. On 21 November SAC went to DEFCON 3. On 27 November SAC returned to normal alert posture and began coordinating the return of its Florida planes to their home bases.

The squadron deployed personnel and aircraft to the Pacific during Vietnam War, beginning in 1967. As SAC participation in the Vietnam War increased, so did the demand for its aircraft, aircrew, and support personnel. From about 1 October 1967 to about 1 April 1968, about 22 September 1968 to about 21 March 1969, March to June 1972 and after 30 April 1972 all, or almost all, of the squadrons personnel and aircraft were detached to units engaging in Operation Arc Light combat missions over North Vietnam or elsewhere in Southeast Asia. The number of squadron aircraft on alert decreased (Note: This alert status was not uniform through the command. Units committed to Arc Light had no alert bombers, while undeployed units maintained normal alert status. Which category a specific unit fell into varied over time.) Even when planes were available for alert, crews had rotated to the combat zone and they could not be manned.

The squadron was inactivated in 1974 with the inactivation of its parent 99th Wing, and the transfer of Westover to the Air Force Reserve.

=== Test operations ===
The 346th's mission changed when it became the 346th Test and Evaluation Squadron in June 1993 and was activated under the 99th Test Group at Ellsworth Air Force Base, South Dakota. For the next two years, it performed operational test and evaluation for Air Combat Command systems. The squadron and 99th Group were inactivated at Ellsworth in 1995 as ACC centralized its operational test and evaluation under the 53d Wing at Eglin Air Force Base, Florida.

The squadron was again activated at Kelly Air Force Base, Texas in August 2000 as the 346th Test Squadron and assigned to the 318th Information Operations Group. As part of the unit's focus on cyber defense, in 2014 it began participating in a joint project of the Air Force Civil Engineer Center and Twenty-Fourth Air Force to protect Air Force industrial control systems against attacks from external sources. This project recognized that industrial control systems (systems commonly used to automate physical industrial processes such as electrical and transportation operations) have become increasingly automated, rendering them vulnerable to cyber attacks. The squadron was redesignated the 346th Cyberspace Test & Evaluation Squadron on 28 January 2025

== Lineage ==
- Constituted as the 346th Bombardment Squadron (Heavy) on 28 January 1942

Activated on 1 Jun 1942
Redesignated 346th Bombardment Squadron, Heavy on 29 September 1944
Inactivated on 8 November 1945
Redesignated 346th Bombardment Squadron, Very Heavy on 13 May 1947
Activated in the reserve on 29 May 1947
Inactivated on 27 June 1949
Redesignated 346th Strategic Reconnaissance Squadron, Heavy and activated on 1 January 1953
Redesignated 346th Bombardment Squadron, Heavy on 1 October 1955
Inactivated on 31 March 1974
Redesignated 346th Test and Evaluation Squadron on 1 June 1993
Activated on 15 June 1993
Inactivated on 21 September 1995
Redesignated 346th Test Squadron on 17 July 2000
Activated on 1 August 2000
Redesignated 346th Cyberspace Test & Evaluation Squadron on 28 January 2025

=== Assignments ===
- 99th Bombardment Group, 1 June 1942 – 8 November 1945
- 99th Bombardment Group, 29 May 1947 – 27 June 1949
- 99th Strategic Reconnaissance Wing (later 99th Bombardment Wing), 1 January 1953 – 31 March 1974
- 99th Test Group, 15 June 1993 – 21 September 1995
- 318th Information Operations Group (later 318th Cyberspace Operations Group), 1 August 2000 – present

=== Stations ===
- Orlando Army Air Base, Florida, 1 June 1942
- MacDill Field, Florida, 1 June 1942
- Pendleton Field, Oregon, 29 June 1942
- Gowen Field, Idaho, 28 August 1942
- Walla Walla Army Air Field, Washington, 25 September 1942
- Sioux City Army Air Base, Iowa, 18 November 1942 – 3 January 1943
- Navarin Airfield, Algeria, 16 March 1943
- Oudna Airfield, Tunisia, 5 August 1943
- Tortorella Airfield, Italy, c. 13 December 1943
- Marcianise Airfield, Italy, c. 27 October – 8 November 1945
- Birmingham Municipal Airport, Alabama, 29 May 1947 – 27 June 1949
- Fairchild Air Force Base, Washington, 1 January 1953
- Westover Air Force Base, Massachusetts, 4 September 1956 – 31 March 1974
- Ellsworth Air Force Base, South Dakota, 15 June 199 – 21 September 1995
- Kelly Air Force Base (later Kelly Field Annex, Lackland Air Force Base, Joint Base San Antonio-Lackland), Texas, 1 Aug 2000 – present

=== Aircraft ===
- Boeing B-17 Flying Fortress, 1942–1945
- Convair B-36 Peacemaker, 1953–1956
- Convair RB-36 Peacemaker, 1953–1956
- Boeing B-52 Stratofortress, 1956–1974

=== Awards and campaigns ===
Award streamer	Award	Dates	Notes
	Distinguished Unit Citation	5 July 1943	Sicily, 346th Bombardment Squadron
	Distinguished Unit Citation	23 April 1944	Austria, 346th Bombardment Squadron
	Air Force Outstanding Unit Award with Combat "V" Device	2-21 March and 15–31 March 1970	346th Bombardment Squadron
	Air Force Outstanding Unit Award	1 October 1967-1 March 1968	346th Bombardment Squadron
	Air Force Outstanding Unit Award	2 March-1 April 1968	346th Bombardment Squadron
	Air Force Outstanding Unit Award	1 July 1971-30 June 1972	346th Bombardment Squadron
	Air Force Outstanding Unit Award	1 June 2008-31 May 2009	346th Test Squadron
	Air Force Outstanding Unit Award	18 August 2009-1 October 2010	346th Test Squadron
	Air Force Outstanding Unit Award	2 October 2010-30 September 2011	346th Test Squadron
	Air Force Outstanding Unit Award	1 October 2013-30 September 2014	346th Test Squadron
	Air Force Organizational Excellence Award	1 June 2003-31 May 2004	346th Test Squadron
	Vietnamese Gallantry Cross with Palm	2 March 1969-31 March 1970	346th Bombardment Squadron

Campaign Streamer	Campaign	Dates	Notes
	Air Offensive, Europe	16 March 1943 – 5 June 1944	346th Bombardment Squadron
	Tunisia	16 March 1943 – 13 May 1943	346th Bombardment Squadron
	Air Combat, EAME Theater	16 March 1943 – 11 May 1945	346th Bombardment Squadron
	Sicily	14 May 1943 – 17 August 1943	346th Bombardment Squadron
	Naples-Foggia	18 August 1943 – 21 January 1944	346th Bombardment Squadron
	Anzio	22 January 1944 – 24 May 1944	346th Bombardment Squadron
	Rome-Arno	22 January 1944 – 9 September 1944	346th Bombardment Squadron
	Central Europe	22 March 1944 – 21 May 1945	346th Bombardment Squadron
	Normandy	6 June 1944 – 24 July 1944	346th Bombardment Squadron
	Northern France	25 July 1944 – 14 September 1944	346th Bombardment Squadron
	Southern France	15 August 1944 – 14 September 1944	346th Bombardment Squadron
	North Apennines	10 September 1944 – 4 April 1945	346th Bombardment Squadron
	Rhineland	15 September 1944 – 21 March 1945	346th Bombardment Squadron
	Po Valley	3 April 1945 – 8 May 1945	346th Bombardment Squadron

== See also ==
- List of B-52 Units of the United States Air Force
- Boeing B-17 Flying Fortress Units of the Mediterranean Theater of Operations
