= 347th Bombardment Squadron =

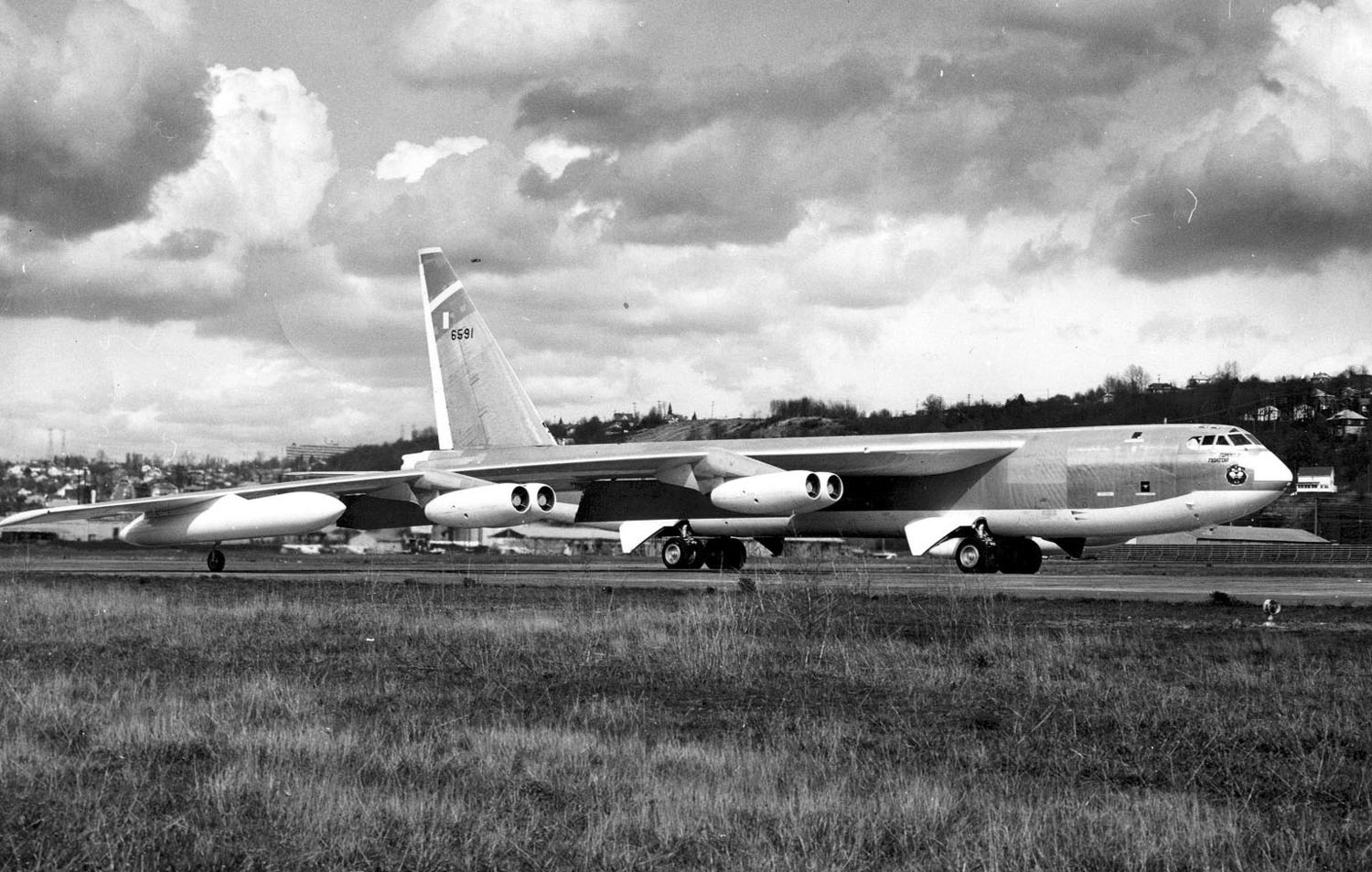
- B-52D Stratofortress as flown by the squadron (Note: Aircraft is Boeing B-52D-75-BO Stratofortress, serial 56-591, Tommy's Tigator.)
- Active: 1942–1945; 1947–1949; 1953–1963
- Country: United States
- Branch: United States Air Force
- Role: Heavy bomber
- Engagements: European Theater of Operations; Mediterranean Theater of Operations
- Decorations: Distinguished Unit Citation

Insignia
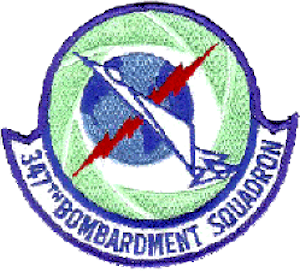
- Patch with 347th Bombardment Squadron emblem (Note: Approved 11 May 1954. Description: On a disc white, outlined Air Force blue, the stylized aperture of a camera green, all outlined of the second [color mentioned], over the upper right (dexter) part of the disc a globe, light blue, shaded, land markings of Air Force blue, over all in saltire a stylized futuramic aircraft proper and a bolt of lightning red.)

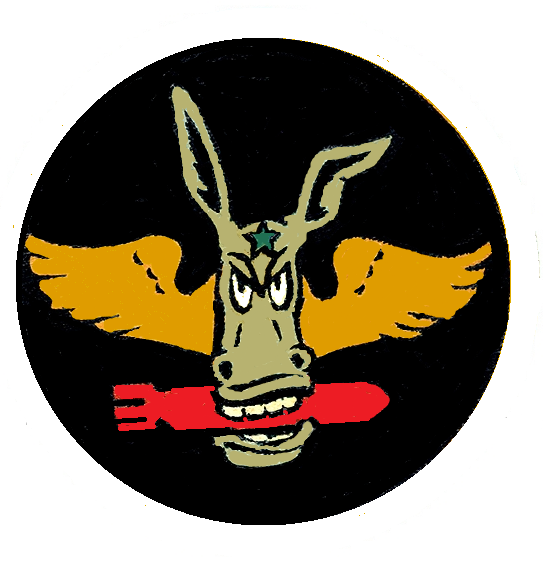
- 347th Bombardment Squadron emblem (Note: Approved 18 February 1944.)

The 347th Bombardment Squadron is an inactive United States Air Force unit. It was last assigned to the 4047th Strategic Wing, and was inactivated at McCoy Air Force Base, Florida on 1 April 1963.

The squadron was first activated in 1942. After training in the United States, it moved to the Mediterranean Theater of Operations, where it earned two Distinguished Unit Citations in operations against the Axis powers. After V-E Day, the squadron remained in Italy until November 1945, when it was inactivated. The squadron was activated in the reserves from 1947 to 1949, but does not appear to have been fully manned or equipped.

In 1953, the squadron was activated as the 347th Strategic Reconnaissance Squadron as part of Strategic Air Command. It returned to the bombardment mission two years later, and served in this role until inactivating in 1963.

== History ==
=== World War II ===
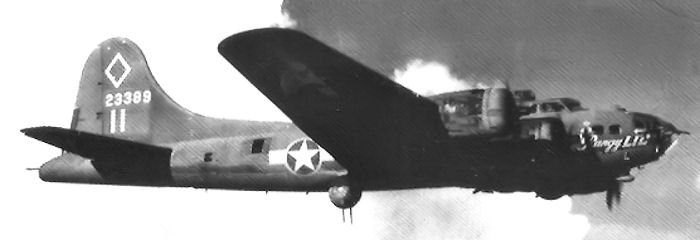
Squadron B-17F Flying Fortress (Note: Aircraft is Douglas Aircraft built Boeing B-17F-50-DL Flying Fortress, serial 42-3389, Rangy Lil Photo taken in August 1943. It is seen wearing the 99th Group's distinctive diamond marking on the tail, along with the Roman numeral II associated with the squadron. The aircraft was passed on to the 340th Bombardment Squadron on 14 November 1943, but was ditched in the Mediterranean after a mission to Toulon, France on 20 November. Baugher, Joe (2 June 2023). "1942 USAF Serial Numbers". Joe Baugher.)

The squadron was activated in June 1942 as one of the four original squadrons of the 99th Bombardment Group, at Orlando Army Air Base, Florida, moving on paper the same day to MacDill Field, Florida. However, the Army Air Forces had decided to concentrate all heavy bomber training under Second Air Force, and before the end of the month, the squadron moved to Pendleton Field, Oregon to begin its training in Boeing B-17 Flying Fortresses. It continued training with the B-17 until January 1943, when it began deploying to the Mediterranean Theater of Operations.

The squadron's ground echelon went by ship from New York City to Marrakesh, Morocco; the air echelon flew to Morrison Field, Florida, then along the South Atlantic Route. The ground and air echelons of the squadron were reunited at Navarin Airfield, Algeria in March 1943. It moved forward to Oudna Airfield, Tunisia after the Allies drove Axis forces from North Africa in May 1943. The squadron concentrated on targets such as airfields, harbor facilities, shipping, viaducts and bridges in North Africa, Sicily and Italy. In early June 1943, the squadron participated in Operation Corkscrew, the reduction of Pantelleria Island in preparation for the invasion of Sicily.

The squadron helped neutralize enemy fighter aircraft opposition to Operation Husky, the invasion of Sicily, penetrating enemy air defenses by bombing airplanes, hangars and fuel and ammunition storage sites at Gerbini Airfield. For these actions, it was awarded the Distinguished Unit Citation (DUC).

In November 1943, the 347th became part of Fifteenth Air Force, which focused on the strategic bombing campaign against Germany. The following month it moved to Tortorella Airfield, Italy. From this base, it engaged in the bombardment of enemy targets in Austria, Bulgaria, Czechoslovakia, France, Germany, Greece, Hungary, Italy, Romania, and Yugoslavia; attacking oil refineries, marshaling yards, aircraft factories, and other strategic objectives. On 23 April 1944, the squadron participated in an attack on aircraft factories in Wiener Neustadt, Austria, despite heavy enemy interceptor opposition. For this action, it was awarded a second DUC.

Following V-E Day, the squadron became part of the occupation forces in Italy, until inactivating in November 1945.

=== Air Force Reserve ===
The squadron was activated under Air Defense Command (ADC) in the reserve at Birmingham Municipal Airport, Alabama, on 19 May 1947 and was again assigned to the 99th Group. Its training was supervised by ADC's 477th AAF Base Unit (later the 2587th Air Force Reserve Training Center). As the post war Air Force took shape, the National Guard was considered the first line of reserve. Reserve units like the 347th got what was left over after National Guard units received facilities, equipment and aircraft. Aircraft were allotted to reserve units as a means of maintaining flying proficiency, not combat readiness. Aircraft assigned to the reserves were overwhelmingly trainers, and no heavy bombers were ever assigned. The allotment of units to the reserves was made only for planning purposes and mobilization plans called for personnel assigned to the 347th to be called to active duty during mobilization as individuals, not as a unit.

In 1948 Continental Air Command (ConAC) assumed responsibility for managing both Air Force Reserve and National Guard units from ADC. President Truman’s reduced 1949 defense budget, however, required reductions in the number of units in the Air Force, ConAC also reorganized its reserve units under the Wing Base Organization, and the 19th Air Division and other reserve units at Birmingham Municipal Airport, including the squadron, were inactivated and replaced by the 514th Troop Carrier Wing in June 1949.

=== Strategic Air Command ===
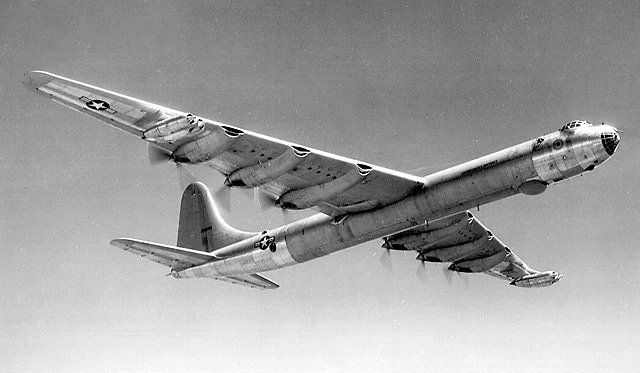
Convair B-36 Peacemaker

The squadron was redesignated the 347th Strategic Reconnaissance Squadron and activated in January 1953 at Fairchild Air Force Base, Washington when the 111th Strategic Reconnaissance Wing, an Air National Guard unit that had been mobilized for the Korean War, was returned to state control. The squadron assumed the mission, personnel, and Convair RB-36 Peacemaker strategic reconnaissance aircraft (Note: The 129th was converting to RB-36s from Boeing RB-29 Superfortresses.) of the 111th Wing's 129th Strategic Reconnaissance Squadron, a regular unit assigned to the 111th Wing, which was simultaneously inactivated. On 16 June 1954 the squadron, along with SAC's other B-36 reconnaissance units was assigned bombing as its primary mission, although it continued to fly reconnaissance missions until September 1956. However, it retained its designation until October 1955, when it again became the 347th Bombardment Squadron.

In 1956, the squadron moved to Westover Air Force Base, Massachusetts, where it began upgrading to Boeing B-52 Stratofortress jet bombers. General Thomas S. Power set an initial goal of maintaining one third of SAC's planes on fifteen minute ground alert, fully fueled and ready for combat to reduce vulnerability to a Soviet missile strike. Eleven per cent of SAC’s bombers were on alert by the end of 1957. That number grew to 12 percent in 1958 and 20 percent by 1959. The command’s goal of one third was finally reached in 1960. In 1962, the number of the squadron's planes on alert was increased to one half. SAC planners were looking into methods to protect their forces in addition to the ground alert program as early as 1957. Tests under the name Operation Head Start were precursors to Operation Chrome Dome. In January 1961, SAC disclosed it was maintaining an airborne force for "airborne alert training."

Large concentrations of bombers, like the 45 B-52s of the 99th Wing at Westover, made attractive targets for an enemy strike. SAC decided to disperse its B-52 force to smaller wings with 15 bombers at other bases. This not only complicated Soviet targeting planning, but with more runways, it would take less time to launch the bomber force. As a result, in 1961 the squadron moved to McCoy Air Force Base, Florida and was assigned to SAC's 4047th Strategic Wing.

Soon after detection of Soviet missiles in Cuba, SAC withdrew its forces from McCoy as the base became saturated with tactical forces deploying to Florida. All degraded and adjusted alert sorties were brought up to full capability. With the exception of planes already on alert, the squadron's planes left Florida by 21 October. Squadron bombers carried nuclear weapons in ferrying configuration. Alert planes left McCoy by 24 October in Operation Riders, sending B-52Ds to Turner Air Force Base, Georgia and Sheppard Air Force Base, Texas. On 20 October the squadron was directed to put two additional planes on alert. On 22 October. 1/8 of SAC's B-52s were placed on airborne alert. On 24 October SAC went to DEFCON 2, placing all aircraft on alert. On 21 November SAC returned to normal airborne alert posture. On 21 November SAC went to DEFCON 3. On 27 November SAC returned to normal alert posture and began coordinating the return of its Florida planes to their home bases.

Later in 1962, SAC received authority from Headquarters USAF to discontinue its Major Command controlled (MAJCON) strategic wings that were equipped with combat aircraft (Note: MAJCON units could not carry a permanent history or lineage. Ravenstein, Charles A. (1984). A Guide to Air Force Lineage and Honors (2d, Revised ed.). Maxwell AFB, AL: USAF Historical Research Center. p. 12.) and to replace them with Air Force controlled (AFCON) units, most of which were inactive at the time, but which could carry a lineage and history. In this reorganization, the 306th Bombardment Wing, which had been scheduled for inactivation, instead moved to McCoy, where it replaced the 4047th Wing. The 347th was inactivated and transferred its mission, personnel and equipment to the 367th Bombardment Squadron, which was simultaneously activated.

== Lineage ==
- Constituted as the 347th Bombardment Squadron (Heavy) on 28 January 1942

Activated on 1 June 1942
Redesignated 347th Bombardment Squadron, Heavy on 29 September 1944
Inactivated on 8 November 1945
Redesignated 347th Bombardment Squadron, Very Heavy on 13 May 1947
Activated in the reserve on 29 May 1947
Inactivated on 27 June 1949
Redesignated 347th Strategic Reconnaissance Squadron, Heavy and activated on 1 January 1953
Redesignated 347th Bombardment Squadron, Heavy on 1 October 1955
Discontinued and inactivated on 1 April 1963

=== Assignments ===
- 99th Bombardment Group, 1 June 1942 – 8 November 1945
- 99th Bombardment Group, 29 May 1947 – 27 Jun 1949
- 99th Strategic Reconnaissance Wing (later 99th Bombardment Wing), 1 January 1953
- 4047th Strategic Wing, 1 September 1961 – 1 April 1963

=== Stations ===
- Orlando Army Air Base, Florida, 1 June 1942
- MacDill Field, Florida, 1 June 1942
- Pendleton Field, Oregon, 29 June 1942
- Gowen Field, Idaho, 28 August 1942
- Walla Walla Army Air Field, Washington, 30 September 1942
- Sioux City Army Air Base, Iowa, 18 November 1942 – 3 January 1943
- Navarin Airfield, Algeria 22 February 1943 – 25 March 1943
- Oudna Airfield, Tunisia, 4 August 1943
- Tortorella Airfield, Italy, 11 December 1943
- Marcianise Airfield, Italy, c. 27 October – 8 November 1945
- Birmingham Municipal Airport, Alabama, 29 May 1947 – 27 June 1949
- Fairchild Air Force Base, Washington, 1 January 1953
- Westover Air Force Base, Massachusetts, 4 September 1956
- McCoy Air Force Base, Florida, 1 September 1961 – 1 April 1963

=== Aircraft ===
- Boeing B-17 Flying Fortress, 1942–1945
- Convair B-36 Peacemaker, 1953–1956
- Convair RB-36 Peacemaker, 1953–1956
- Boeing B-52D Stratofortress, 1956–1963

=== Awards and campaigns ===
| Award streamer | Award | Dates | Notes |
|---|---|---|---|
| | Distinguished Unit Citation | 5 July 1943 | Sicily |
| | Distinguished Unit Citation | 23 April 1944 | Austria |

| Campaign Streamer | Campaign | Dates | Notes |
|---|---|---|---|
| | Air Offensive, Europe | 16 March 1943 – 5 June 1944 | |
| | Tunisia | 16 March 1943 – 13 May 1943 | |
| | Air Combat, EAME Theater | 16 March 1943 – 11 May 1945 | |
| | Sicily | 14 May 1943 – 17 August 1943 | |
| | Naples-Foggia | 18 August 1943 – 21 January 1944 | |
| | Anzio | 22 January 1944 – 24 May 1944 | |
| | Rome-Arno | 22 January 1944 – 9 September 1944 | |
| | Central Europe | 22 March 1944 – 21 May 1945 | |
| | Normandy | 6 June 1944 – 24 July 1944 | |
| | Northern France | 25 July 1944 – 14 September 1944 | |
| | Southern France | 15 August 1944 – 14 September 1944 | |
| | North Apennines | 10 September 1944 – 4 April 1945 | |
| | Rhineland | 15 September 1944 – 21 March 1945 | |
| | Po Valley | 3 April 1945 – 8 May 1945 | |

== See also ==
- Boeing B-17 Flying Fortress Units of the Mediterranean Theater of Operations
- List of B-52 Units of the United States Air Force
