= 416th Flight Test Squadron =

416th Flight Test Squadron

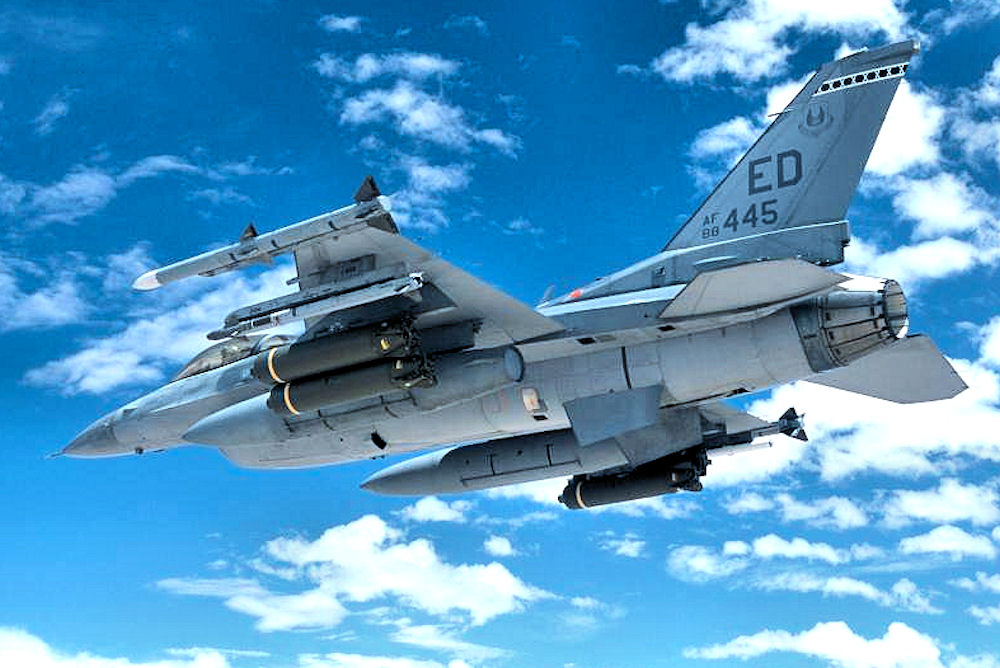
- 416th Flight Test Squadron F-16C during a successful AIM-9X test (Note: Aircraft is General Dynamics F-16C Block 42C Fighting Falcon serial 88-0445. The Global Power Fighters Combined Test Force fired the AIM-9X, marking the variant's first guided launch from the aircraft.)
- Active: 1942–1945; 1947–1949; 1989–present
- Country: United States
- Branch: United States Air Force
- Type: Squadron
- Role: Flight testing
- Part of: Air Force Materiel Command
- Garrison/HQ: Edwards Air Force Base, California
- Nickname: Skulls
- Engagements: European Theater of Operations; Mediterranean Theater of Operations
- Decorations: Distinguished Unit Citation; Air Force Outstanding Unit Award

Insignia
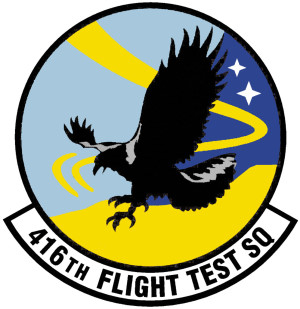
- 416th Flight Test Squadron emblem (Note: Approved 10 October 1995. Celeste, on a pile bendwise sinister Azure two mullets of four in pale Argent, issuant from base a mound and issuant from dexter chief a contrail arcing to base in perspective and an additional arc in dexter base Or, overall an eagle stooping in silhouette Sable all within a diminished bordure of the last [color mentioned].)

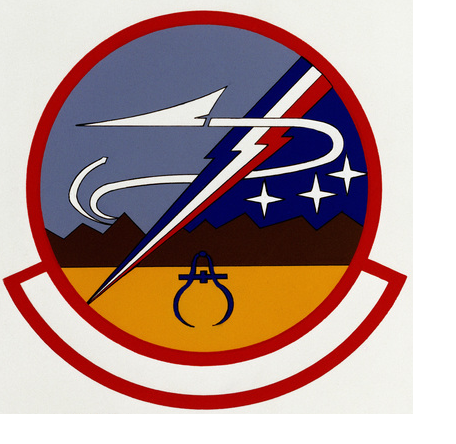
- 6516th Test Squadron emblem (Note: Approved 24 May 1990.)

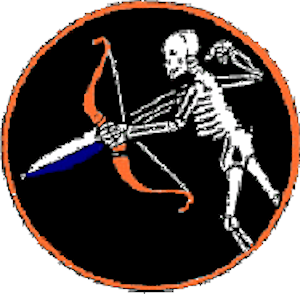
- Patch with 416th Bombardment Squadron emblem (Note: Approved 11 January 1943. Description: On a black disc, border orange, a white skeleton holding an orange bow, discharging a white aerial bomb, shaded blue, with white speed lines.)
- Tail code: ED
- Fin stripe: Blue tailband with white X signs

The 416th Flight Test Squadron is a United States Air Force squadron. It is assigned to the 412th Operations Group, Air Force Materiel Command at Edwards Air Force Base, California. The 416th performs flight testing on General Dynamics F-16 Fighting Falcon aircraft.

The squadron's first predecessor was constituted as the 26th Reconnaissance Squadron in January 1942. However, it was redesignated the 416th Bombardment Squadron before being activated in June 1942. After training in the United States, It deployed to the Mediterranean Theater of Operations. From bases in North Africa and Italy, it engaged in the strategic bombing campaign against Germany. It earned two Distinguished Unit Citations for its performance in combat. It remained in Italy following V-E Day until inactivating in November 1945. The squadron was active in the reserves from 1947 to 1949, but was not fully manned or equipped.

The second predecessor is the 6516th Test Squadron, which was established in 1989 to test the F-16. In October 1992, the two squadrons were consolidated as the 416th Test Squadron.

== Mission ==
The 416th performs flight testing on General Dynamics F-16 Fighting Falcon aircraft. It also provides test support with Northrop T-38 Talons.

== History ==
=== World War II ===
The first predecessor of the squadron was established as the 26th Reconnaissance Squadron in January 1942, shortly after the Attack on Pearl Harbor. However, before it was activated in June, it was redesignated the 416th Bombardment Squadron, becoming one of the four original squadrons of the 99th Bombardment Group at MacDill Field, Florida. However, the Army Air Forces had decided to concentrate all heavy bomber training under Second Air Force, and before the end of the month, the squadron moved to Pendleton Field, Oregon to begin its training in Boeing B-17 Flying Fortresses. It continued training with the B-17 until January 1943, when it began deploying to the Mediterranean Theater of Operations.

The squadron arrived in the Mediterranean Theater of Operations in late March 1943, beginning operations from Navarin Airfield, Algeria, moving forward to Oudna Airfield, Tunisia after the Allies drove Axis forces from North Africa in May 1943. The squadron concentrated on targets such as airfields, harbor facilities, shipping, viaducts and bridges in North Africa, Sicily and Italy. In early June 1943, the squadron participated in Operation Corkscrew, the reduction of Pantelleria Island in preparation for the invasion of Sicily.

The squadron helped neutralize enemy fighter aircraft opposition to Operation Husky, the invasion of Sicily, penetrating enemy air defenses by bombing airplanes, hangars and fuel and ammunition storage sites at Gerbini Airfield. For these actions, it was awarded the Distinguished Unit Citation (DUC).

In November 1943, the 416th became part of Fifteenth Air Force, which focused on the strategic bombing campaign against Germany. The following month it moved to Tortorella Airfield, Italy. From this base, it engaged in the bombardment of enemy targets in Austria, Bulgaria, Czechoslovakia, France, Germany, Greece, Hungary, Italy, Romania, and Yugoslavia; attacking oil refineries, marshaling yards, aircraft factories, and other strategic objectives. On 23 April 1944, the squadron participated in an attack on aircraft factories in Wiener Neustadt, Austria, despite heavy enemy interceptor opposition. For this action, it was awarded a second DUC.

Following V-E Day, the squadron became part of the occupation forces in Italy, until inactivating in November 1945.

=== Reserve operations ===
The squadron was again activated under Air Defense Command (ADC) in the reserve at Robins Field, Georgia, on 17 July 1947 and again assigned to the 99th Group, which was located at Birmingham Municipal Airport, Alabama. Although it was nominally a very heavy bomber unit, it is not clear whether or not the squadron was fully staffed or equipped with combat aircraft. In 1948 Continental Air Command assumed responsibility for managing reserve and Air National Guard units from ADC. President Truman’s reduced 1949 defense budget, however, required reductions in the number of units in the Air Force, and the 416th was inactivated and not replaced as reserve flying operations at Robins ceased.

=== F-16 flight testing ===
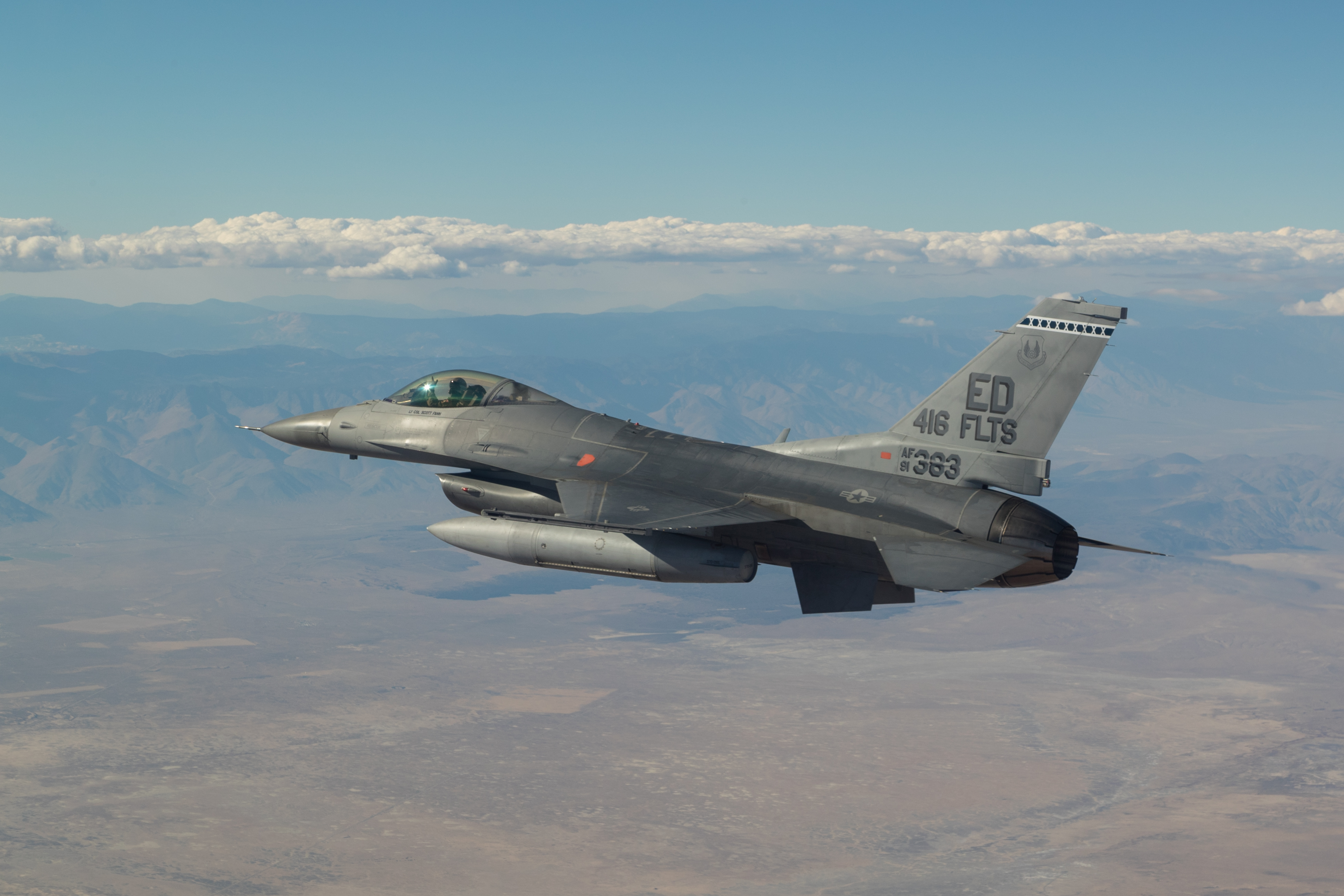
A squadron F-16 flies over the Mojave desert

The second predecessor of the squadron, the 6516th Test Squadron, was activated at Edwards Air Force Base, California in March 1989 for testing weapons systems and specialized equipment for the General Dynamics F-16 Fighting Falcon. Because of this mission, the squadron is equipped with a variety of F-16 models. Weapons testing is typically conducted together with operational testing squadrons stationed at Eglin Air Force Base. Squadron F-16s involved in these tests are usually painted in a regular gray USAF scheme, while squadron aircraft used as chase planes for other aircraft test programs had red tails and ventral fins. (Note: In an economy measure, starting in 2015, these planes no longer were painted in the special paint scheme. No byline (13 April 2022). "Edwards Test Ops Consolidates: New Structure 412th Test Wing Takes Shape (Flashback report from 2014)". Phodocu Publishing.) These chase planes are used to chase Lockheed Martin F-22 Raptors and Lockheed Martin F-35 Lightning IIs, at Eglin and at Naval Air Station Joint Reserve Base Fort Worth. Other squadron planes used to test radar sets or to conduct anechoic testing are completely white.

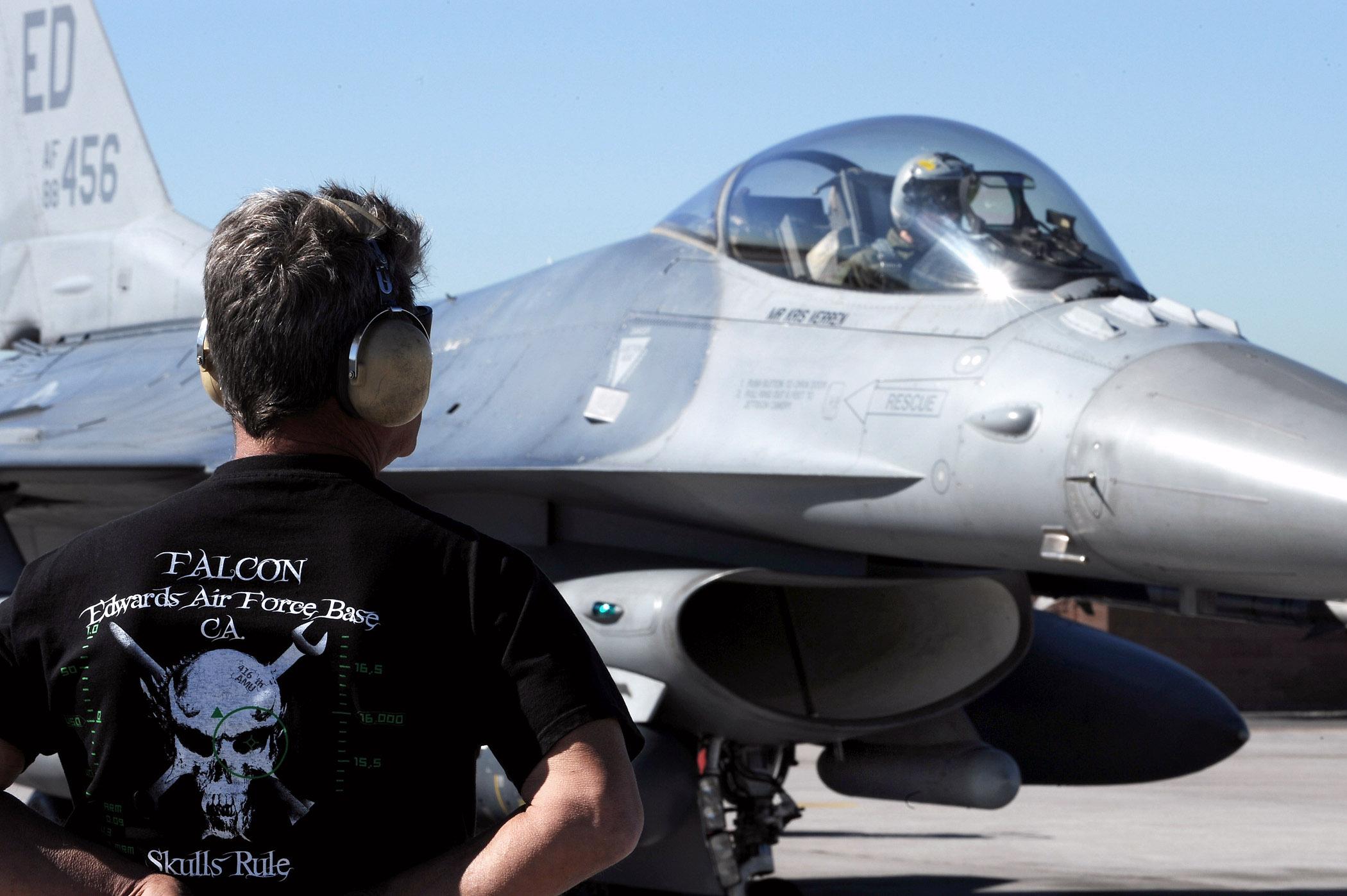
A squadron F-16 participates in a Red Flag Exercise at Nellis Air Force Base in February 2009.

In the 1990s the squadron helped in the development of the Mid Life Upgrade (MLU) package for older F-16A and F-16B models. This program updated planes that were primarily flown by North Atlantic Treaty Organization air forces. Although this program did not affect USAF F-16s, the squadron provided a test aircraft for this program. This plane has been used to test other enhancement packages, including the USAF Common Configuration Implementation Program program.

In the 1990s the 416th led the flight test effort in the development of the AN/ASQ-213 HARM targeting system. The performance of this interim solution was instrumental in the retirement of the F-4G Wild Weasel aircraft in the mid 1990s. The Air Force planned to replace the McDonnell F-4G Phantom II but the program was cancelled and the AN/ASQ-213 remains the primary F-16 Suppression of Enemy Air Defenses (SEAD) mission sensor for the HARM missile more than 25 years later.

The 416th and 6516th Squadrons were consolidated on 1 October 1992 and designated the 416th Test Squadron the following day. The consolidated unit became the 416th Flight Test Squadron on 1 March 1994

The unit briefly gained the McDonnell Douglas F-15 Eagle test mission in 2004. Starting in 2005, the F-15 fleet was sent to Eglin Air Force Base when the F-35 Lightning IIs arrived in 2006.

During early 2009, the squadron deployed to Nellis Air Force Base, Nevada and participated in Red Flag exercise 09-2 to perform operational testing for the F-16's operating system M5.1+ software. This was the first of this type of deployment for any Air Force Materiel Command unit. The squadron deployed to Nellis again in 2012 to test software for the 6.1+ operating system. Although primary deployed to test this system, the 416th was also a participant in the exercise with one of its pilots taking the top SEAD pilot award.

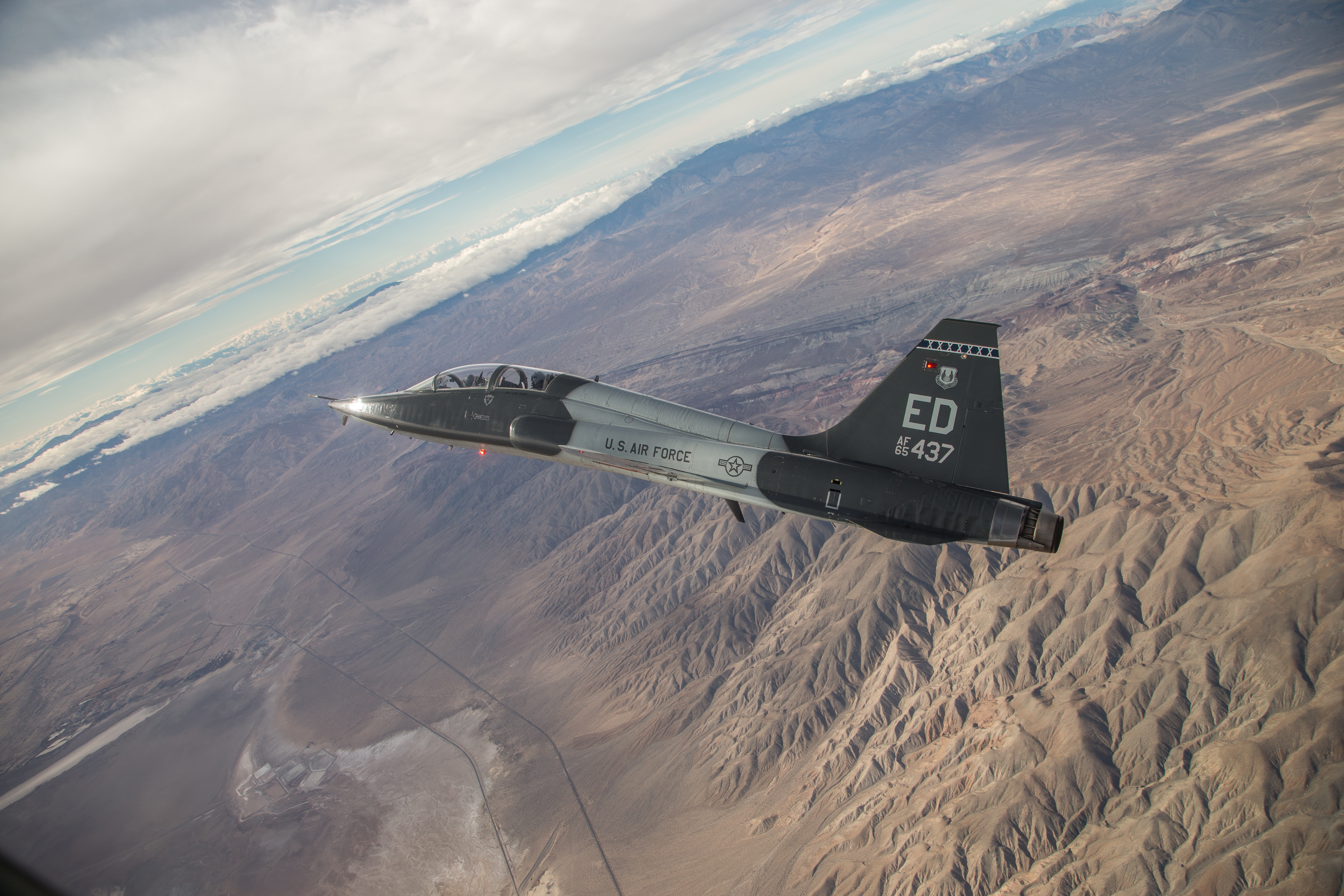
416th Flight Test Squadron T-38C Talon

In addition to its F-16 testing role, the squadron also trains qualified test pilots for other testing programs. In addition, F-16s being transferred to the air arms of other countries sometimes need more testing even after the first aircraft are delivered and the squadron continues these tests after the planes' delivery to the foreign military.

In the spring of 2015, the 445th Flight Test Squadron, which had been conducting "Test Operations" at Edwards was inactivated and its mission transferred to other test squadrons. A large portion of this mission was absorbed by the 416th, along with the 445th's F-16s and Northrop T-38 Talons.

=== Astronauts from the squadron ===
Former members of the 416th who have been NASA astronauts include Michael J. Bloomfield, Duane Carey, Rex J. Walheim, James Dutton and Nick Hague. (Note: The biographies of Carey and Walheim mention their service as F-16 test pilots or with the Combined Test Force at Edwards AFB, but do not expressly mention the 416th Squadron.)

== Lineage ==
416th Bombardment Squadron

- Constituted as the 26th Reconnaissance Squadron (Heavy) on 28 January 1942

Redesignated 416th Bombardment Squadron (Heavy) on 22 April 1942
Activated on 1 June 1942
Redesignated 416th Bombardment Squadron, Heavy on 20 August 1943
Inactivated on 8 November 1945

- Redesignated: 416th Bombardment Squadron, Very Heavy on 3 July 1947

Activated in the reserve on 17 July 1947
Inactivated on 27 June 1949

- Consolidated with the 6516th Test Squadron as the 6516th Test Squadron on 1 October 1992

416th Flight Test Squadron

- Designated as the 6516th Test Squadron and activated on 10 March 1989

Consolidated with the 416th Bombardment Squadron on 1 October 1992
Redesignated 416th Test Squadron on 2 October 1992
Redesignated 416th Flight Test Squadron on 1 March 1994

=== Assignments ===
- 99th Bombardment Group, 1 June 1942 – 8 November 1945
- 99th Bombardment Group, 17 July 1947 – 27 June 1949
- 6510th Test Wing (later 412th Test Wing), 10 March 1989
- 412th Operations Group, 1 October 1993 – present

=== Stations ===
- MacDill Field, Florida, 1 June 1942
- Pendleton Field, Oregon, 29 June 1942
- Gowen Field, Idaho, 28 August 1942
- Walla Walla Army Air Base, Washington, 30 September 1942
- Sioux City Army Air Base, Iowa, 17 November 1942 – 3 January 1943
- Navarin Airfield, Algeria, 25 March 1943
- Oudna Airfield, Tunisia, 5 August 1943
- Tortorella Airfield, Italy, 14 December 1943
- Marcianise Airfield, Italy, c. 27 October–8 November 1945
- Robins Field (later Robins Air Force Base), Georgia, 17 July 1947 – 27 June 1949
- Edwards Air Force Base, California, 10 March 1989 – present

=== Awards and campaigns ===
Award streamer	Award	Dates	Notes
	Distinguished Unit Citation	5 July 1943	416th Bombardment Squadron, Sicily
	Distinguished Unit Citation	23 Apr9p 1944	416th Bombardment Squadron, Austria
	Air Force Outstanding Unit Award	1 January–31 December 1996	416th Flight Test Squadron
	Air Force Outstanding Unit Award	1 January–31 December 1998	416th Flight Test Squadron
	Air Force Outstanding Unit Award	1 January 2010–31 December 2011	416th Flight Test Squadron
	Air Force Outstanding Unit Award	1 January–31 December 2012	416th Flight Test Squadron
	Air Force Outstanding Unit Award	1 January–31 December 2013	416th Flight Test Squadron

Campaign Streamer	Campaign	Dates	Notes
	Air Offensive, Europe	25 March 1943 – 5 June 1944	416th Bombardment Squadron
	Air Combat, EAME Theater	25 March 1943 – 11 May 1945	416th Bombardment Squadron
	Tunisia	25 March 1943 – 13 May 1943	416th Bombardment Squadron
	Sicily	14 May 1943 – 17 August 1943	416th Bombardment Squadron
	Naples-Foggia	18 August 1943 – 21 January 1944	416th Bombardment Squadron
	Anzio	22 January 1944 – 24 May 1944	416th Bombardment Squadron
	Rome-Arno	22 January 1944 – 9 September 1944	416th Bombardment Squadron
	Central Europe	22 March 1944 – 21 May 1945	416th Bombardment Squadron
	Normandy	6 June 1944 – 24 July 1944	416th Bombardment Squadron
	Northern France	25 July 1944 – 14 September 1944	416th Bombardment Squadron
	Southern France	15 August 1944 – 14 September 1944	416th Bombardment Squadron
	North Apennines	10 September 1944 – 4 April 1945	416th Bombardment Squadron
	Rhineland	15 September 1944 – 21 March 1945	416th Bombardment Squadron
	Po Valley	3 April 1945 – 8 May 1945	416th Bombardment Squadron

=== Aircraft ===
- Boeing B-17 Flying Fortress, 1942–1945
- General Dynamics F-16 Fighting Falcon, 1989–present
- McDonnell Douglas F-15 Eagle/Strike Eagle, 2004–2005
- Northrop T-38 Talon, 2015–present
- T-7 Red Hawk, 2024-present

== See also ==
- List of United States Air Force test squadrons
- Boeing B-17 Flying Fortress Units of the Mediterranean Theater of Operations
