= Saint-Donat (disambiguation) =

Saint-Donat is a commune in France.

It may also refer to:

- Saint-Donat Airfield, a World War II military airfield in Algeria
- Saint-Donat, Lanaudière, Quebec
- Saint-Donat, Bas-Saint-Laurent, Quebec
- Saint-Donat-sur-l'Herbasse, a commune in south-eastern France
- St Donats (Welsh: Sain Dunwyd), a village and community in south Wales
- Châteauneuf-Val-Saint-Donat, a commune in the Alpes-de-Haute-Provence department in southeastern France

== See also ==
- Saint Donatus, several people
