= Tortorella Airfield =

Abandoned WWII military airfield

Tortorella Airfield
- Part of Fifteenth Air Force
- Province of Foggia, Italy
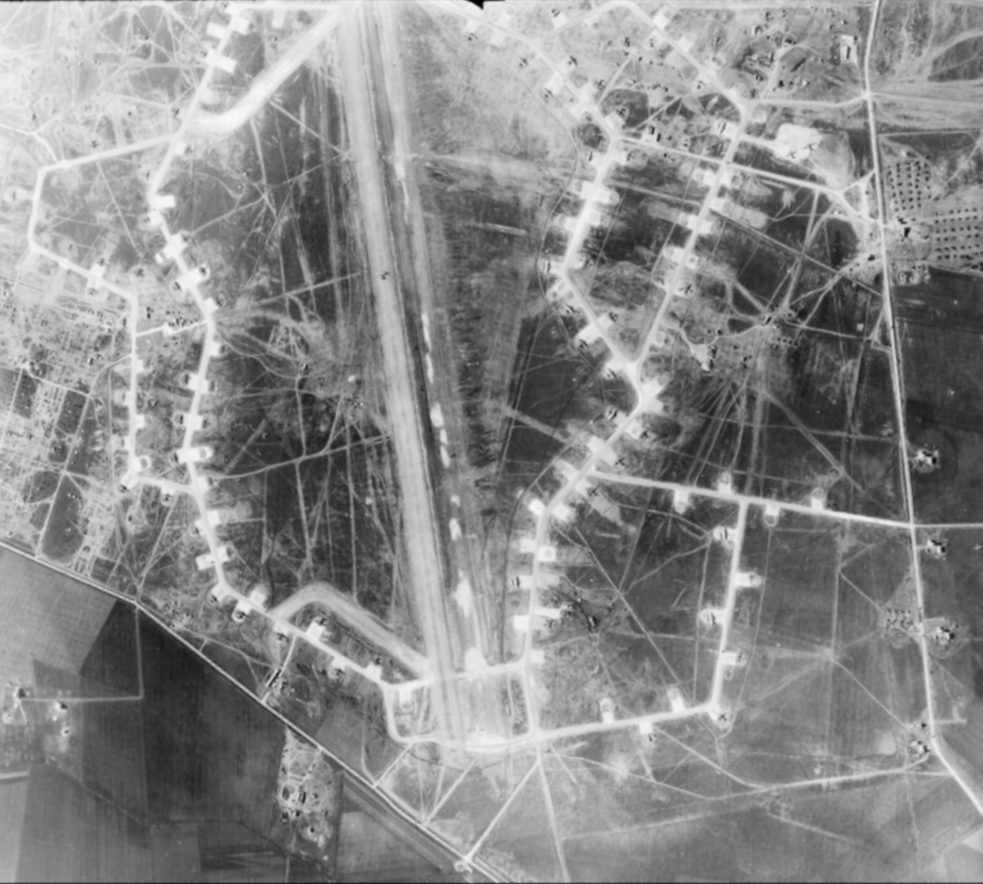
- 27 February 1945 airphoto

Site information
- Type: Military airfield
- Controlled by: United States Army Air Forces

Location
- Location of Tortorella Airfield, Italy
- Coordinates: 41°29′07″N 015°39′5″E

Site history
- Built: 1943
- In use: 1943-1945
- Battles/wars: World War II

Tortorella Airfield is an abandoned World War II military airfield in Italy. It was located 9.4 kilometers east-northeast of Foggia, in the Province of Foggia. The airfield was abandoned and dismantled after the end of the war in 1945.

== History ==
Tortorella Airfield was a temporary wartime facility built by the US Army Corps of Engineers. Construction was initiated shortly after Allied forces seized control of the Tavoliere plain around Foggia, Apulia, Italy.

The major tenant of the airfield was the 99th Bombardment Group, which arrived from Oudna Airfield, Tunisia on 11 December 1943. It was equipped with Boeing B-17 Flying Fortress bombers. Tortorella was shared with 231 Wing (37 and 70 Squadrons) of No. 205 Group RAF. It was equipped with Vickers Wellington Mk.X, Consolidated Liberators, Short Stirlings and Avro Lancaster bombers. Tortorella was one of the few stations that the RAF was in a tenant status to the US Army Air Forces.

The 99th Bomb Group consisted of four squadrons:

- 346th Bombardment Squadron
- 347th Bombardment Squadron
- 348th Bombardment Squadron
- 416th Bombardment Squadron

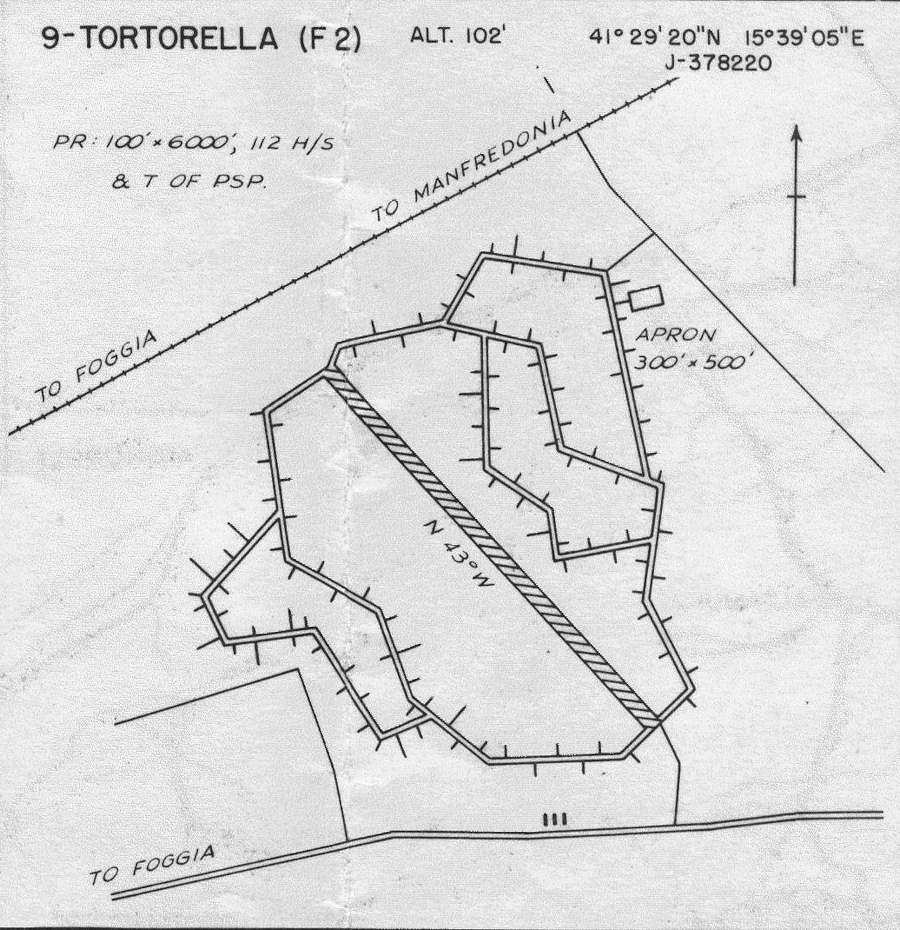
General map of airfield

The airfield had a single, 6,700' x 100' asphalt runway laid over pierced steel planking, oriented 16/34. A second (unfinished) runway east of the main runway was used as a crash strip. There were two perimeter tracks, and several other loop taxiways each containing about 50 aircraft parking hardstands. The 99th used the west side of the field, and the RAF the east.

There may have been some temporary hangars and buildings; however, it appears that personnel were quartered primarily in tents, and most aircraft maintenance took place in the open on hardstands. It also had a steel control tower. Headquarters for the 99th Bomb Group was located in the town of Tavernola, about 3 km east of the airfield.

Both the RAF and the 99th departed after the end of the war, the 99th moving to Marcianise Airfield in October 1945, where its B-17s were placed into storage. Sometime after that departure, the engineers moved in and dismantled the facility.

Today Tortorella Airfield has been returned to agriculture; however, some scarring of the landscape remains, with evidence of the main runway visible in aerial photos.

== See also ==
- Boeing B-17 Flying Fortress airfields in the Mediterranean Theater of Operations
