= Boeing B-17 Flying Fortress Units of the Mediterranean Theater of Operations =

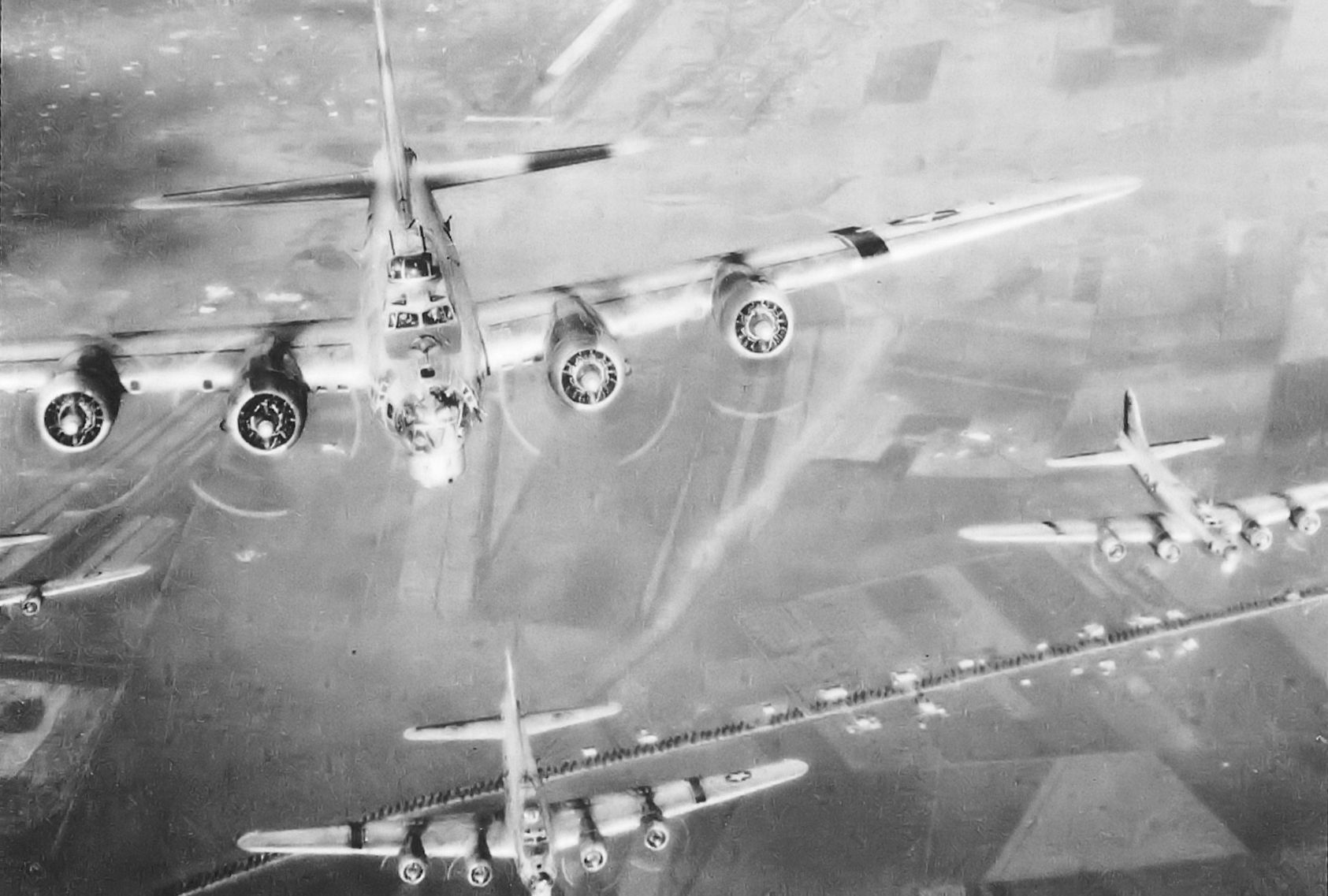
B-17 Flying Fortresses of the 2d Bombardment Group on a mission from Amendola Airfield, Italy, 1944

United States Army Air Forces formations and units in the Mediterranean Theater of Operations (MTO) were the second-largest user of the Boeing B-17 Flying Fortress during World War II. There were a total of six combat groups (twenty-four squadrons) equipped with the bomber assigned to the Theater.

== Overview ==
Initially equipped with the B-17F Flying Fortress, the 97th and 301st Bombardment Groups were flown from airfields in England to Algiers and Oran, Algeria in November 1942 after the Operation Torch landings. They were assigned to the 5th Bombardment Wing, XII Bomber Command, Twelfth Air Force.

These initial two groups were joined in February 1943 by the 99th and in April 1943 by the 2d Bombardment Group, which both arrived from the United States. These heavy bomber units supported the American Fifth Army as it drove west into Tunisia during the North African Campaign. Initial targets were enemy positions in Tunisia, Sicily, Italy, and islands in the Mediterranean Sea.

On 1 November 1943, the Twelfth Air Force became a tactical organization of fighters and medium bombers. Its heavy bombardment units (B-17 and B-24) were joined with those of the Ninth Air Force which had been based in Libya and which was moving without personnel or equipment to be re-established as a tactical organization in England. The combined heavy bomber forces in the Mediterranean were then designated as the Fifteenth Air Force, with all B-17 groups remaining assigned to the 5th Bombardment Wing. Fifteenth Air Force's mission was to carry out long distance bombardment missions against enemy targets in Southern and Central Europe. The groups also received their first B-17G Flying Fortresses in late 1943, and were moved to newly captured airfields in the Foggia area of Southern Italy. In Italy two new B-17 groups, the 463d and 483d Bombardment Groups, arrived from Third Air Force’s training airfields in the Southeastern United States in the spring of 1944 to reinforce the command.

From their bases in Southern Italy, the Fortresses engaged in long-range strategic bombardment attacks against the enemy in Austria, the Balkans, Bulgaria, Czechoslovakia, France, Germany, Greece, Poland, and Romania. Additionally, Fifteenth Air Force B-17s joined with Eighth Air Force B-17s as part of Operation Frantic, shuttle bombing raids against targets on the Eastern Front, landing at Poltava Airfield (AAF-559) in the Soviet Union during the spring of 1944.

Fifteenth Air Force, along with its B-17 units were inactivated after the German capitulation in May 1945.

== Airfields ==
B-17 units in the Mediterranean Theater of Operations operated from the following Airfields:

Algeria (Twelfth Air Force)

Ain M'lila Airfield (2d, 301st Bombardment Groups, Jan–Jul 1943)
36°00′19″N 006°34′22″E (Approximate)
Biskra Airfield (97th, 301st Bombardment Groups, Dec 1942 – Feb 1943)
34°47′36″N 005°44′17″E
Chateau-dun-du-Rhumel Airfield (2d, 97th Bombardment Groups, Feb–Aug 1943)
36°08′39″N 006°07′53″E (Approximate)
Maison Blanche Airport, Algiers, (97th Bombardment Group, Nov 1942)
36°41′27″N 003°12′55″E

Navarin Airfield (2d 99th Bombardment Groups, Feb–Apr 1943)
36°07′11″N 005°49′29″E (Approximate)
Oran Tafaraoui Airport (97th, 301st Bombardment Group, Nov–Dec 1942)
35°32′27″N 000°32′02″W
Saint-Donat Airfield (301st Bombardment Group, Mar–Aug 1943)
36°06′38″N 005°59′19″E (Approximate)

Tunisia (Twelfth/Fifteenth Air Force)

Bizerte Airfield (2d Bombardment Group, Dec 1943)
37°14′36″N 009°47′11″E
Depienne Airfield (97th Bombardment Group, Aug–Dec 1943)
36°25′49″N 010°00′31″E
Massicault Airfield (2d Bombardment Group, Jul–Dec 1943)
36°43′15″N 009°56′35″E

Oudna Airfield (99th, 301st Bombardment Groups, Aug–Dec 1943)
36°38′09″N 010°05′48″E
Pont du Fahs Airfield (97th Bombardment Group, Mar–Aug 1943)
36°21′00″N 009°50′42″E

Italy (Fifteenth Air Force)

Amendola Airfield (2d, 97th Bombardment Group, Dec 1943 – May 1945)
41°32′29″N 015°42′44″E
Celone Airfield (463d Bombardment Group, Mar 1944 – May 1945)
41°32′26″N 015°31′57″E (Approximate)
Lucera Airfield (301st Bombardment Group, Feb 1944 – May 1945)
41°29′52″N 015°25′29″E

Tortorella Airfield (99th, 483d Bombardment Groups, Dec 1943 – May 1945)
41°29′03″N 015°39′15″E
Sterparone Airfield (483d Bombardment Group, Apr 1944 – May 1945)
41°36′02″N 015°18′48″E

- Foggia Airfield (2d Bombardment Group, Postwar use, unit inactivation and aircraft storage area)

41°25′55″N 015°32′07″E

- Marcianise Airfield (97th, 99th Bombardment Groups) (Postwar use, unit inactivation and aircraft storage site)

41°06′55″N 014°10′34″E

- Pisa Airport (483d Bombardment Group) (Postwar use by Air Transport Command)

43°41′02″N 010°23′33″E

Most combat airfields were temporary wartime facilities quickly constructed with pierced-steel planking runways and parking areas, with tents used for personnel quarters and a few wooden buildings used for operations. In Tunisia and Italy, some captured German Luftwaffe or Italian Air Force (Regia Aeronautica) airfields were repaired and placed into service. Today, most show little evidence of their existence other than some faint outlines in agricultural fields.

== Units ==
- US Army, Middle East Air Force (USAMEAF)

2 July – 18 December 1942
1st Provisional Bombardment Group; Later: 376th Bombardment Group (No Tail Code)
Provisional organization formed at RAF Lydda, British Palestine on 1 July 1942. It had nine B-17E Flying Fortresses transferred from the 7th Bombardment Group, Fifth Air Force in Australia that had escaped from the Philippines or were sent from the United States in January 1942. The B-17s attacked the harbor at Tobruk, Libya seven times with day and night raids throughout July. Withdrawn for depot-level maintenance then returned for several more raids against enemy targets in Libya, Crete and Greece during October–December 1942. Last operational use made on 18 December 1942 when they attacked harbor facilities at Sousse, Tunisia. Transferred to non-combat duties with Air Transport Command.

- 2d Bombardment Group

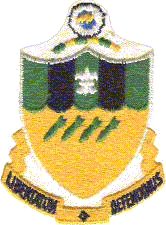

25 April 1943 – 1 July 1945
Entered Combat: 28 April 1943
20th Bombardment Squadron (Circle-Y)]
49th Bombardment Squadron (Circle-Y V)
96th Bombardment Squadron (Circle-Y T)
429th Bombardment Squadron (Circle-Y Half-Arrow)
Deployed from Great Falls Army Air Base, Montana to Camp Don B. Passage (Casablanca), French Morocco, 12 April 1943; Air echelon arrived at Marrakesh, French Morocco, 16 April 1943; Operations began from Navarin Airfield, Algeria, 22 April 1943 Inactivated at Foggia Airfield, Italy, 28 February 1946

- 97th Bombardment Group

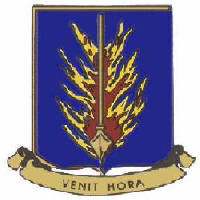

13 November 1942 – 29 October 1945
Entered Combat: 16 November 1942
340th Bombardment Squadron (Triangle-Y O Red Diagonal Stripe Tail Rudder)
341st Bombardment Squadron (Triangle-Y 1 Red Diagonal Stripe Tail Rudder)
342d Bombardment Squadron (Triangle-Y 2 Red Diagonal Stripe Tail Rudder)
414th Bombardment Squadron (Triangle-Y 3 Red Diagonal Stripe Tail Rudder)
Transferred from VIII Bomber Command, 13 November 1942; Arrived Maison Blanche Airport, Algiers, Algeria, 13 November 1942; The first combat heavy bomber mission of Twelfth Air Force was flown from Maison Blanche Airport on 16 November 1942 when six B-17s of the 340th Bombardment Squadron attacked Sidi Ahmed Airfield at Bizerte, Tunisia. Inactivated at Marcianise Airfield, Italy on 29 October 1945

- 99th Bombardment Group

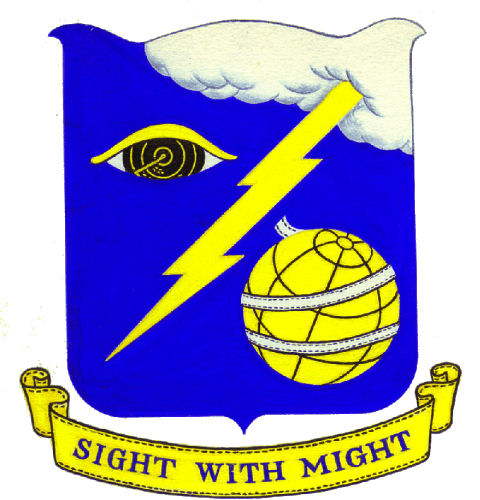

22 February 1943 – 8 November 1945
Entered Combat: 16 March 1943
346th Bombardment Squadron (Diamond-Y I)
347th Bombardment Squadron (Diamond-Y II)
348th Bombardment Squadron (Diamond-Y III)
416th Bombardment Squadron (Diamond-Y IV)
Deployed from Sioux City Army Air Base, Iowa, 22 February 1943; Operations began from Navarin Airfield, Algeria 22 February 1943. Inactivated at Marcianise Airfield, Italy, 8 November 1945

- 301st Bombardment Group

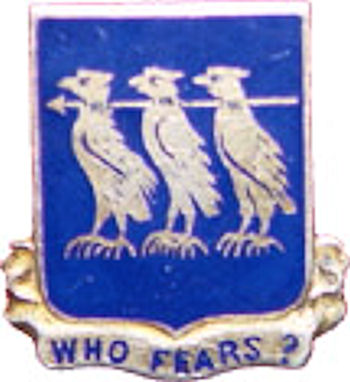

26 November 1942 – 28 July 1945
Entered Combat: 28 November 1942
32d Bombardment Squadron (Square-Y Green Tail Rudder A/1)
352d Bombardment Squadron (Square-Y Green Tail Rudder B/2)
353d Bombardment Squadron (Square-Y Green Tail Rudder C/3)
419th Bombardment Squadron (Square-Y Green Tail Rudder D/4)
Transferred from VIII Bomber Command, 26 November 1942; Arrived at Tafaraoui Airport, Oran, Algeria on 24 November 1942, mounted first combat mission on 28 November, attacking Bizerte Airfield and dock area in Tunisia. Moved to Biskra Airfield, Algeria, 16 December 1942. Returned to Sioux Falls Army Air Field, South Dakota, 28 July 1945

- 463d Bombardment Group

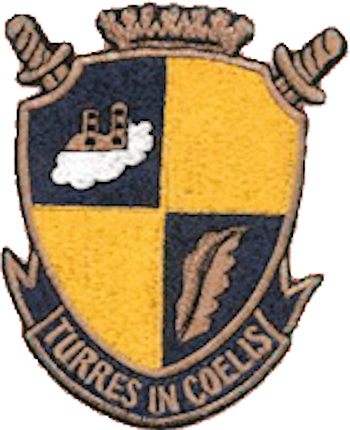

9 March 1944 – 25 September 1945
Entered Combat: 30 March 1944
772d Bombardment Squadron (Wedge-Y Orange Tail Rudder)
773d Bombardment Squadron (Wedge-Y Orange Tail Rudder)
774th Bombardment Squadron (Wedge-Y Orange Tail Rudder)
775th Bombardment Squadron (Wedge-Y Orange Tail Rudder)
Deployed from Lakeland Army Airfield, Florida, 9 March 1944; Operated from Celone Airfield, Italy 9 March 1944 – 25 September 1945 Inactivated in Italy

- 483d Bombardment Group

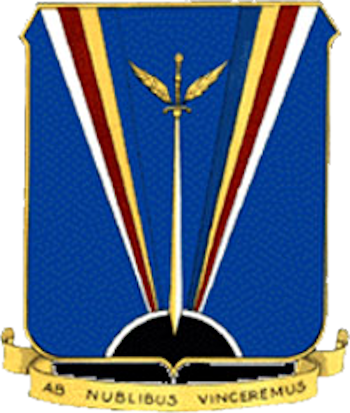

9 March 1944 – 25 September 1945
Entered Combat: 1 April 1944
815th Bombardment Squadron (Y-Star Red Tail Rudder I)
816th Bombardment Squadron (Y-Star Red Tail Rudder II)
817th Bombardment Squadron (Y-Star Red Tail Rudder III)
840th Bombardment Squadron (Y-Star Red Tail Rudder IV)
Deployed from MacDill Army Airfield, Florida, 30 March 1944; Operated from Sterparone Airfield, Italy, 9 April 1944 – 15 May 1945
After war ended, the group was reassigned to Air Transport Command and moved to Pisa Airport, Italy, on 15 May 1943. B-17s converted to transport configuration and used to transport personnel to Port Lyautey Airfield, French Morocco where ATC transports moved them across the Atlantic. Inactivated in Italy on 25 September 1945
