= Saint-Donat Airfield =

WWII airfield in Algeria

Saint-Donat Airfield
- Part of Twelfth Air Force
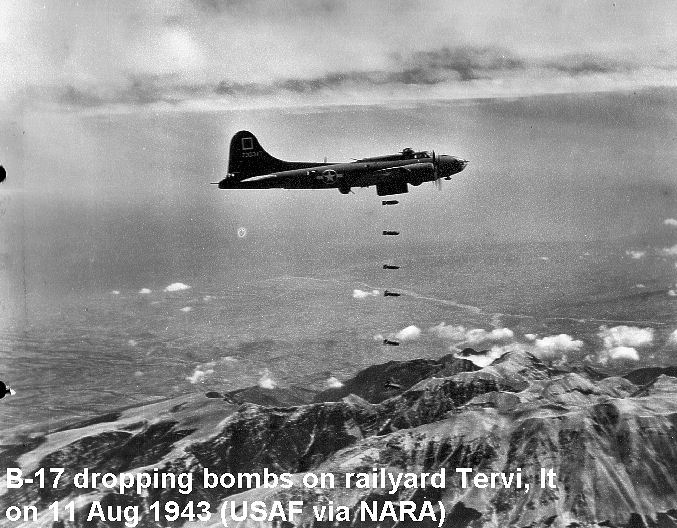
- 301st Bombardment Group B-17F attacking Tervi, Italy, on 11 August 1943.

Site information
- Type: Military airfield
- Controlled by: United States Army Air Forces

Location
- Coordinates: 36°06′38.66″N 005°59′19.72″E

Site history
- Built: 1942
- In use: 1942-1943

Location of Saint-Donat Airfield, Algeria

Saint-Donat Airfield was a World War II military airfield in Algeria, located near Tadjenanet in Mila Province; approximately 63 km southwest of Constantine. It was used by the United States Army Air Force Twelfth Air Force as a heavy bomber (B-17 Flying Fortress) airfield during the North African Campaign. Known units assigned to the field were:

- 301st Bombardment Group, 6 March-6 August 1943, B-17 Flying Fortress

Due to the limited amount of aerial photography available, it is not possible to precisely determine the location and condition of the airfield today.

== See also ==
- Boeing B-17 Flying Fortress airfields in the Mediterranean Theater of Operations
