= Navarin Airfield =

World War II military airfield in Algeria

Navarin Airfield
- Part of Twelfth Air Force
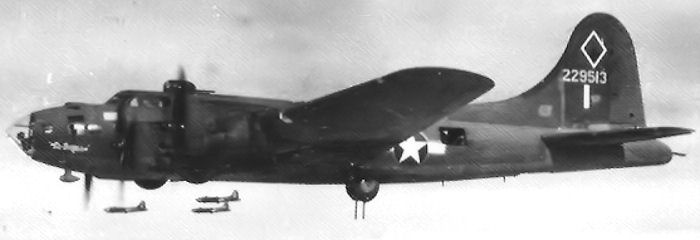
- 346th Bombardment Squadron/99th Bombardment Group B-17F 42-29513 "El Diablo" on a combat mission.

Site information
- Type: Military airfield
- Controlled by: United States Army Air Forces

Location
- Coordinates: 36°07′11.63″N 005°49′29.37″E

Site history
- Built: 1942
- In use: 1942-1943

Location of Navarin Airfield, Algeria

Navarin Airfield is a World War II military airfield in Algeria, located approximately 10 km from El Eulma in Sétif Province. It was used by the United States Army Air Force Twelfth Air Force during the North African Campaign for heavy B-17 Flying Fortress bombers against the German Afrika Korps. B-17s known as the 'Diamondbacks' would fly from here to Rome in Operation Husky in July 1943. Known units assigned were:

- 2d Bombardment Group, 22–27 April 1943, B-17 Flying Fortress
- 99th Bombardment Group, 22 February-25 March 1943, B-17 Flying Fortress

When the Americans moved east into Tunisia, the airfield was dismantled and abandoned. Traces of its runway may be visible on satellite imagery, however a lack of detailed aerial photography of the area limits determining a precise location and current condition of the airfield.

== See also ==
- Boeing B-17 Flying Fortress airfields in the Mediterranean Theater of Operations
