= Oudna Airfield =

Abandoned World War II military airfield in Tunisia

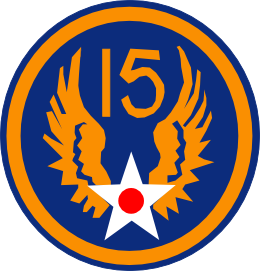
Oudna Airfield

Site information
- Type: Military airfield
- Controlled by: United States Army Air Forces

Location
- Coordinates: 36°38′09.22″N 010°05′48.86″E

Site history
- Built: 1943
- In use: 1943

Location of Oudna Airfield, Tunisia

Oudna Airfield is an abandoned World War II military airfield in Tunisia, located approximately 7 kilometres (4.3 mi) southwest of La Mohammedia, 14 kilometres (8.7 mi) south-southwest of Tunis. It was used by the United States Army Air Force Twelfth Air Force during the North African Campaign as a heavy B-17 Flying Fortress bomber airfield. The units known to be assigned here were:

- 99th Bombardment Group, 4 August-11 December 1943, B-17 Flying Fortress (12AF/15AF after 1 November 1943)
- 301st Bombardment Group, 6 August-7 December 1943, B-17 Flying Fortress (12AF/15AF after 1 November 1943)

Today, the airfield is nearly indistinguishable from the agricultural fields in the area. A faint outline of dispersal pads and taxiways, along with a single-lane agricultural road which is the remnant of the main runway, are visible in aerial photography.

== See also ==
- Boeing B-17 Flying Fortress airfields in the Mediterranean Theater of Operations
