= Marcianise Airfield =

World War II military airfield in Italy

Marcianise Airfield
- Part of Twelfth Air Force

Site information
- Type: Military airfield
- Controlled by: United States Army Air Forces

Location
- Coordinates: 41°01′35″N 014°19′50″E

Site history
- Built: 1944
- In use: 1944-1945

Location of Marcianise Airfield, Italy

Marcianise Airfield is an abandoned World War II military airfield in southeast Italy, which is located approximately 10 km north-northwest of Marcianise in the province of Caserta, Campania; about 32 km north-northwest of Naples. Built in 1943 by United States Army Engineers, the airfield was a large facility capable of handling heavy bombers built for Fifteenth Air Force, which stationed B-17s at the field after the war, prior to their return to the United States. However its primary use was by Air Technical Service Command and by Twelfth Air Force tactical fighter bomber units during the Italian Campaign. The field was used by the senior command of the Mediterranean Theater of Operations based at the Royal Palace of Caserta through 1947.

Major units stationed at Marcianise were:

- 86th Bombardment Group, 30 April-12 June 1944, A-36 Apache (12th AF)
- 97th Bombardment Group, 1–29 October 1945, B-17 Flying Fortress, (15th AF)
- 99th Bombardment Group, 27 October–8 November 1945, B-17 Flying Fortress, (15th AF)

Closed by the Americans on 23 October 1945, today, the location of the airfield is an Italian military base, its precise use is undetermined. The remains of the main runway can be seen on the base in aerial photography.

== See also ==
- Boeing B-17 Flying Fortress airfields in the Mediterranean Theater of Operations
