= Mizpah =

Mizpah may refer to:

== People ==
- Mizpah, pen name of Mildred A. Bonham (1840–1907), American travel writer
- Mizpah Tertullien (1930–2015), Bahamian psychologist and senator

== Places ==
=== Biblical ===
- Mizpah (Judah)
- Mizpah (Moab)
- Mizpah in Benjamin
- Mizpah in Gilead (disambiguation), several places

=== United States ===
- Mizpah, Minnesota, a city in Koochiching County
- Mizpah, New Jersey, an unincorporated community in Atlantic County

== Transportation ==
- Mizpah (aircraft), a Unites States Army Air Forces B-17 lost in action in 1944
- Mizpah (steamboat), which ran on Puget Sound from 1905 to c. 1960
- USS Mizpah (PY-29), a United States Navy patrol yacht converted from a private vessel of the same name in 1942

== Other uses ==
- Mizpah (emotional bond)
- Mizpah, a 1906 play by Ella Wheeler Wilcox

== See also ==
- Mitzpa
- Mitzpe (disambiguation)
- Mizra
- Mizrah
