= Mizpah in Gilead =

Mizpah in Gilead may refer to:

- Mizpah in Gilead (Genesis)
- Mizpah in Gilead (Joshua)
- Mizpah in Gilead (Judges)
