= 817th Expeditionary Airlift Squadron =

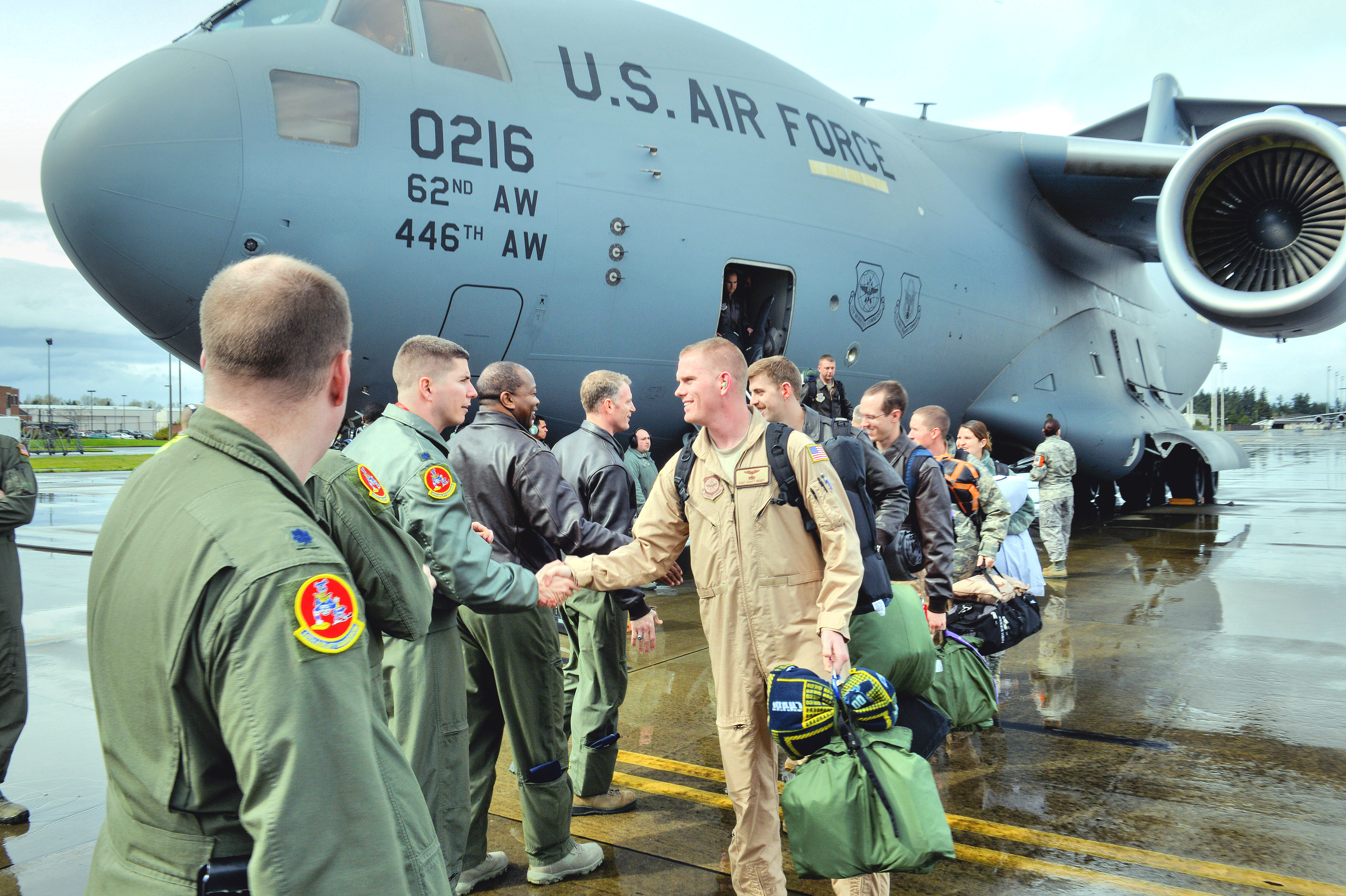
- Members of the 8th Airlift Squadron are welcomed home as they return from deployment to Southwest Asia (Note: Photo taken 5 April 2013 at Joint Base Lewis-McChord, Washington. The airmen were deployed to the 817th Expeditionary Airlift Squadron in support of Operation Enduring Freedom.)
- Active: 1943–1945; 1953–1970; c. 2011–2014
- Country: United States
- Branch: United States Air Force
- Role: Airlift
- Part of: Air Mobility Command
- Mottos: Ad Astra et Ultra (Latin for 'To the Stars and Beyond') (Note: This motto has also been rendered as "Ad Astra et Sursuum".)
- Engagements: Mediterranean Theater of Operations; Korean War; Vietnam War
- Decorations: Distinguished Unit Citation; Air Force Meritorious Unit Award; Air Force Outstanding Unit Award with Combat "V" Device; Air Force Outstanding Unit Award; Korean Presidential Unit Citation; Republic of Vietnam Gallantry Cross with Palm

Insignia
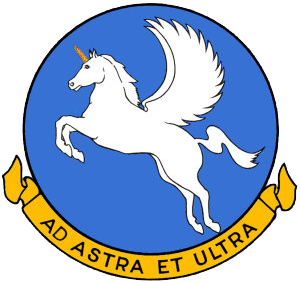
- 817th Expeditionary Airlift Squadron emblem (Note: Approved 19 August 1958. Description: On a medium blue disc, a white winged unicorn in flight, horn Air Force golden yellow, shaded golden brown, outlines and details black throughout.)

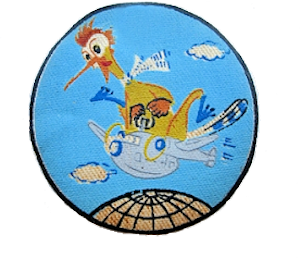
- Unofficial 817th Troop Carrier Squadron emblem (Korean War era)

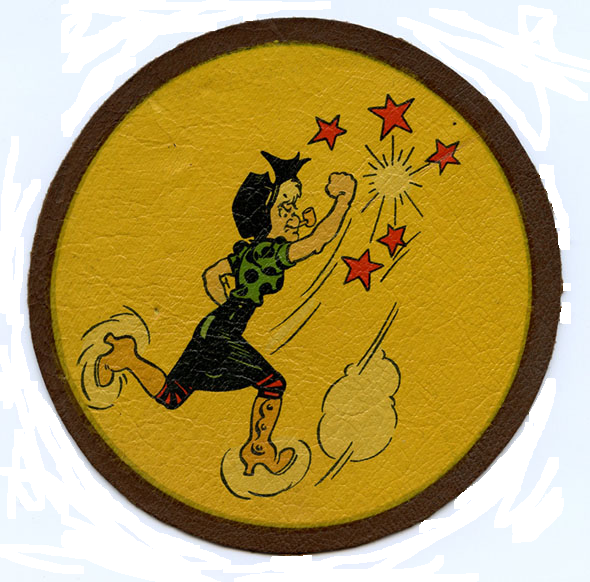
- Unofficial 817th Bombardment Squadron emblem

The 817th Expeditionary Airlift Squadron is a provisional United States Air Force unit, assigned to Air Mobility Command to activate or inactivate as needed. It engaged in combat operations in Southwest Asia.

The squadron was first activated during World War II as the 817th Bombardment Squadron. It trained in the southeastern United States, then was one of the last Boeing B-17 Flying Fortress heavy bomber squadrons to deploy to Italy as part of the Fifteenth Air Force 483d Bombardment Group. It engaged in the strategic bombing campaign against Germany, earning two Distinguished Unit Citations for its actions. Following V-E Day, the squadron's bombers acted as transports in the Green Project transporting American soldiers back to the United States until inactivating in Italy in September 1945.

In 1953, the squadron was redesignated the 817th Troop Carrier Squadron and activated in Japan to replace a reserve unit that had been mobilized for the Korean War and was reverting to reserve status. It supported combat operations in Korea before the signing of the armistice, adding a Korean Presidential Unit Citation award to its honors. The squadron continued to perform airlift operations in the Pacific area after the end of hostilities in Korea. In 1954, it flew airlift support for French forces fighting the Viet Minh in French Indochina. During the Vietnam War, the squadron deployed aircrews and aircraft to Southeast Asia until it was inactivated in 1970, earning a Republic of Vietnam Gallantry Cross with Palm.

== History ==
=== World War II ===
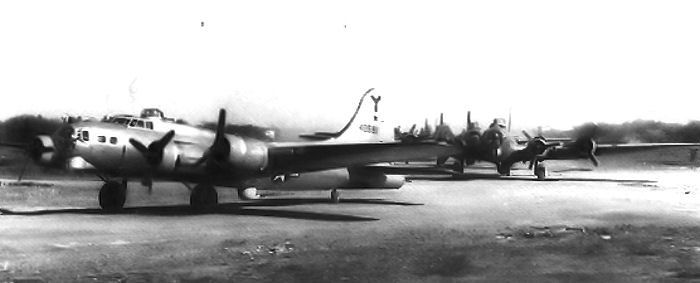
817th Bombardment Squadron bombers on a taxiway at Sterparone Airfield (Note: The lead aircraft is identified in the photograph as Lockheed Vega built Boeing B-17G Flying Fortress serial 44-8591. This aircraft was equipped with H2X "Mickey" radar. It was delivered to the squadron on 3 January 1945, and survived the war and was scrapped in September 1946.)

The squadron was activated at Ephrata Army Air Base as the 817th Bombardment Squadron (Heavy) on 20 September 1943 as one of the four original squadrons of the 483d Bombardment Group. In November, the squadron moved to MacDill Field, Florida, where it trained with Boeing B-17 Flying Fortresses under Third Air Force, as Second Air Force began to concentrate on very heavy bomber training.

The 817th deployed to the Mediterranean Theater of Operations, where it became part of Fifteenth Air Force at Sterparone Airfield in Southern Italy. The squadron's air element flew its Flying Fortresses to Sterparone via Tortorella Airfield, while the ground element moved to Sterparone via troop ship. It began operations in April 1944 with an attack on a cement factory in Split, Yugoslavia.

The squadron engaged in strategic bombing campaign against Germany, striking military, industrial and transport targets, including factories, oil refineries, marshalling yards, airfields, and troop concentrations in Italy, France. Southern Germany, Austria, Czechoslovakia, and the Balkans. In June 1944, the squadron participated in a shuttle mission, departing Italy and landing in the Soviet Union, attacking targets en route and on the return flight. This enabled attacks on targets too far from the squadron's base to strike and return home. The squadron received a Distinguished Unit Citation for combat action two months later. On 18 July 1944 the squadron, along with the other elements of the 483d Group, bombed the objective, an airfield and installations at Memmingen, engaging numerous enemy aircraft in the target area despite a lack of cover from its planned fighter escort. It received a second citation for braving fighter assaults and flak to bomb tank factories at Berlin on 24 March 1945.

The squadron was occasionally diverted from the strategic attack on Germany. It struck targets in southern France in preparation for Operation Dragoon, the invasion of August 1944. The group also supported ground forces in northern Italy during Operation Grapeshot, the Allied offensive in April 1945.

After V-E Day, the unit moved to Pisa Airfield, where it operated under the control of Air Transport Command's Green Project which was the movement of troops back to the United States. The squadron carried troops from Pisa to a staging area in Morocco. Its B-17s were disarmed with flooring and seats for 25 passengers installed. It carried passengers from Pisa to Port Lyautey Airfield, French Morocco for further movement them across the Atlantic. The squadron was inactivated in Italy in September 1945.

=== Korean War ===
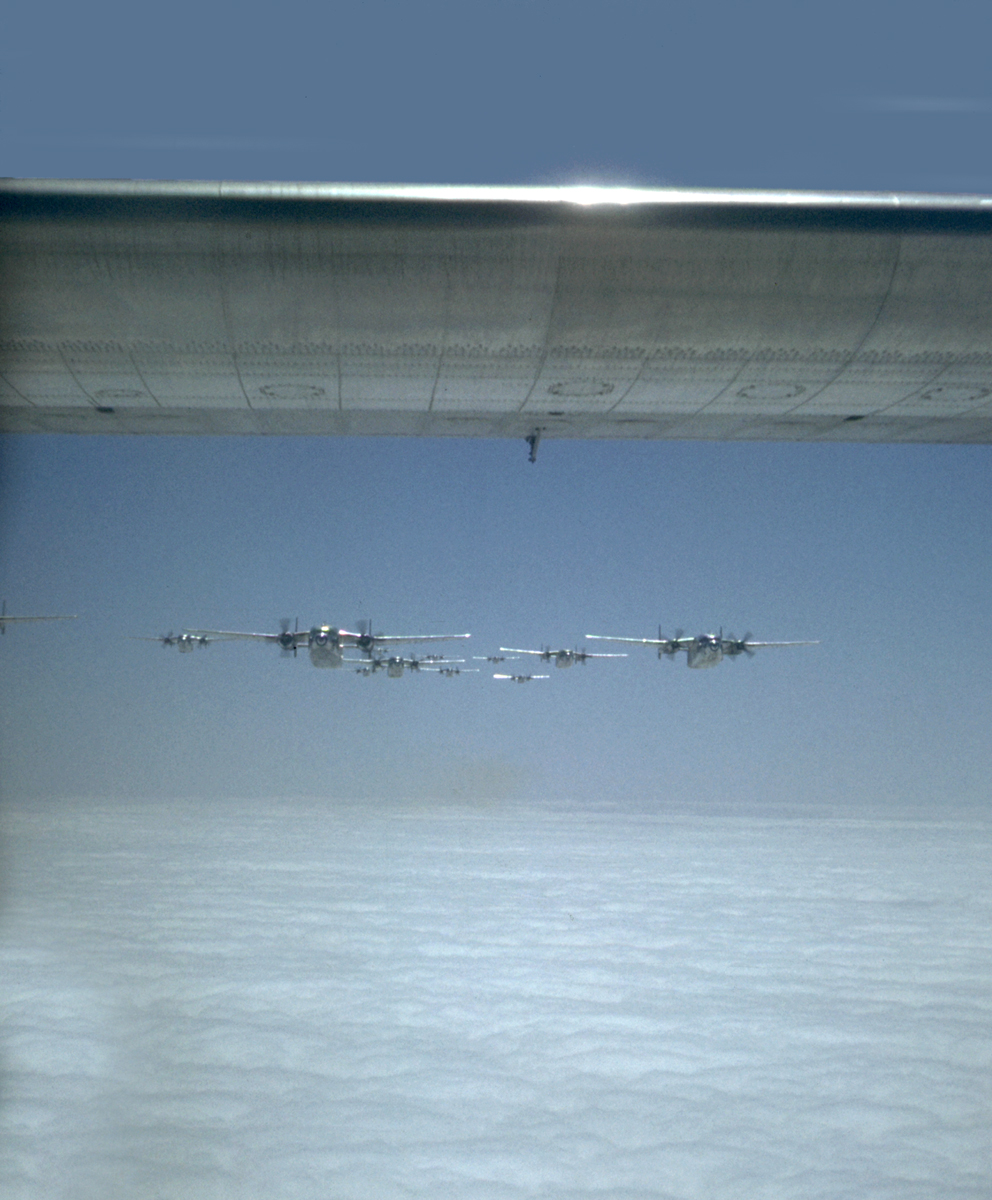
Formation of 817th Troop Carrier Squadron C-119s

The Air Force was returning the 403d Troop Carrier Wing, which was stationed at Ashiya Air Base during the Korean War to reserve status at the beginning of 1953. The 403d Wing had been mobilized in April 1951 and had moved to Japan a year later. In its place, the Air Force activated the 483d Troop Carrier Wing. The 817th was activated as the 817th Troop Carrier Squadron and absorbed the mission, personnel and Fairchild C-119 Flying Boxcars of the 65th Troop Carrier Squadron, which was simultaneously inactivated.

In June 1953, the squadron, along with the other squadrons of the 483d Wing airlifted the 187th Regimental Combat Team from Japan to Korea, to prevent a breakthrough by North Korean and Chinese Communist forces before an armistice agreement could be signed. It performed troop carrier and air transport operations in the Far East, including landing of troops and cargo in forward areas of the combat zone, air transportation of airborne troops and equipment, and air evacuation of casualties, receiving a Korean Presidential Unit Citation for these actions. For its actions in transporting United Nations troops in Korea and training with airborne units, the squadron was one of the first units to earn an Air Force Outstanding Unit Award. Between April 1953 and September 1954, the squadron aided the French Air Force in Indochina by training personnel and hauling supplies. In 1958, the 483d Group was inactivated as Far East Air Forces converted to the dual-deputy organizational model and the squadron was reassigned directly to the wing. That same year, the squadron began conversion to the Lockheed C-130A Hercules, losing its last Flying Boxcar in 1959.

=== Vietnam War ===
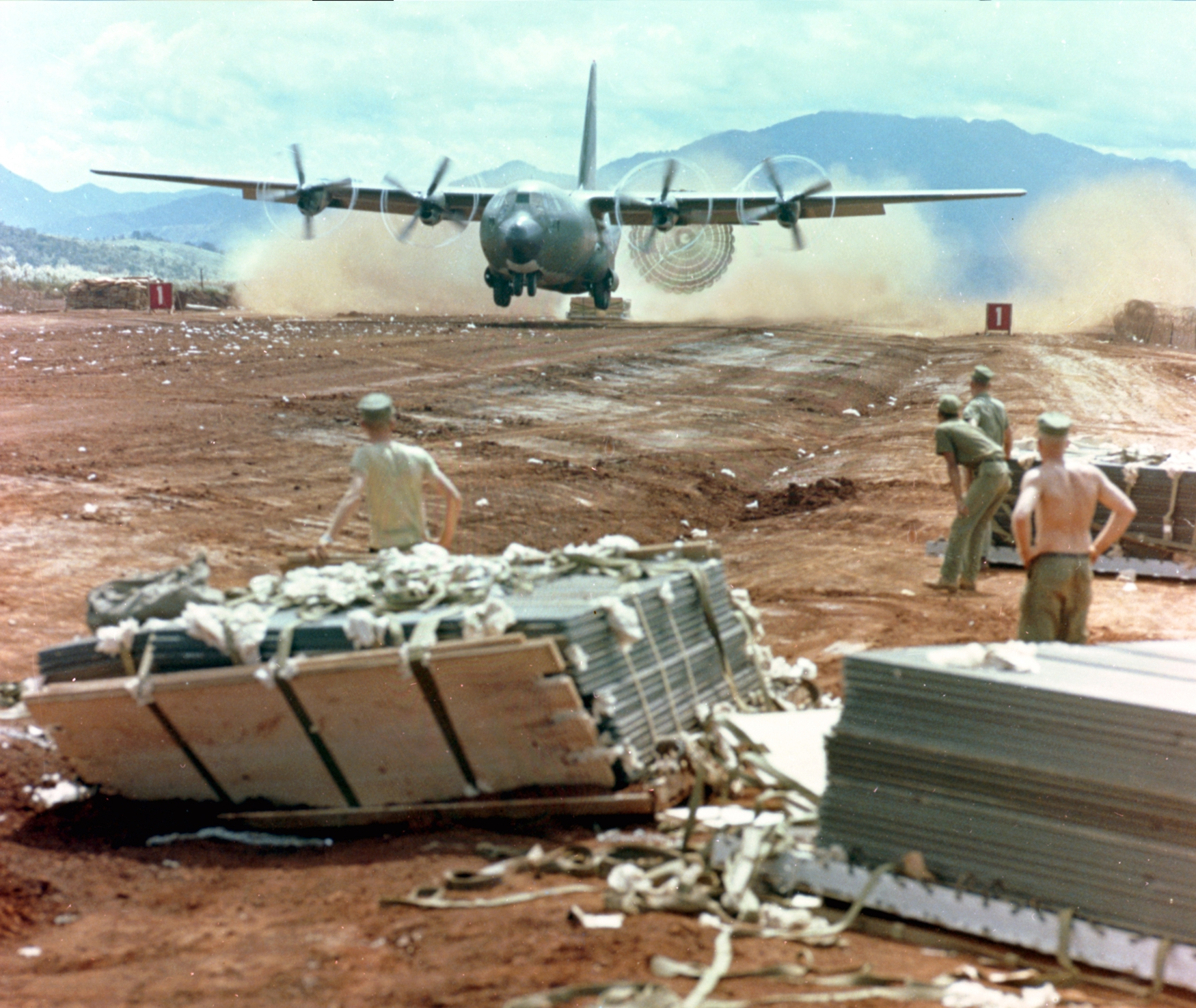
C-130 LAPES drop in Vietnam

On 25 June 1960, the Air Force turned Ashiya Air Base over to the Japanese Air Self Defense Force and the 483d Wing was inactivated. The squadron moved to Naha Air Base, Okinawa, where it was assigned directly to the 315th Air Division. It continued intratheater transport operations, also flying to locations in the Philippines, Thailand and Indochina, supporting United States civilian and military personnel assigned to the region. As the United States increased its combat presence in Indochina in the early 1960s, made frequent flights to airfields in South Vietnam and to locations within the country, periodically deploying crews and aircraft there. As in South Korea, the flights within South Vietnam were extremely hazardous as the squadron operated within combat areas and frequently were under fire from communist forces during takeoff, landing and ground operations. The squadron inactivated in June 1970.

=== Expeditionary operations ===
The squadron was converted to provisional status in 2002 and assigned to Air Mobility Command (AMC) to activate and inactivate as needed.

The squadron was active in 2003 and 2004 at Rhein-Main Air Base, Germany, when it was responsible for controlling strategic airlift operations staging through Rhein-Main and Ramstein Air Bases, Germany to Iraq and Afghanistan areas of operation.

The squadron was active a second time at Incirlik Air Base, Turkey, flying Boeing C-17 Globemaster IIIs with crews rotating from the four squadrons of the 62d Airlift Wing and of its reserve associate 446th Airlift Wing at McChord Air Force Base, Washington as part of the global war on terrorism. The squadron provided strategic airlift, aeromedical evacuation and humanitarian support for Operation Enduring Freedom and Operation New Dawn. It operated as part of AMC's two expeditionary airlift squadron model, operating outside the theater of operations, while the 816th Expeditionary Airlift Squadron handled C-17 operations within the theater.

== Lineage ==
- Constituted as the 817th Bombardment Squadron (Heavy) on 14 September 1943

Activated on 20 September 1943
Redesignated 817th Bombardment Squadron, Heavy c. September 1944

- Inactivated on 25 September 1945
- Redesignated 817th Troop Carrier Squadron, Medium on 15 November 1952

Activated on 1 January 1953
Redesignated 817th Troop Carrier Squadron on 8 December 1965
Redesignated 817th Tactical Airlift Squadron on 1 August 1967
Inactivated on 15 June 1970

- Redesignated 817th Expeditionary Airlift Squadron and converted to provisional status, on 12 June 2002

Active by April 2003 through February 2004
Active by March 2006
Inactivated c. 1 April 2014

=== Assignments ===
- 483d Bombardment Group, 20 September 1943 – 25 September 1945
- 483d Troop Carrier Group, 1 January 1953
- 483d Troop Carrier Wing, 8 December 1958
- 315th Air Division, 25 June 1960 (attached to 6315th Operations Group)
- 374th Troop Carrier Wing (later 374th Tactical Airlift Wing), 8 August 1966 – 15 June 1970
- Air Mobility Command to activate or inactivate at any time after 12 June 2002

362d Air Expeditionary Group, c. 11 April 2003-2004
385th Air Expeditionary Group, 2006-c. 1 April 2014

=== Stations ===
- Ephrata Army Air Base, Washington, 20 September 1943
- MacDill Field, Florida, 7 November 1943 – 2 March 1944
- Sterparone Airfield, Italy, 9 April 1944
- Pisa Airfield, Italy, 15 May 1945 – 25 September 1945
- Ashiya Air Base, Japan, 1 January 1953
- Naha Air Base, Okinawa, 25 June 1960 – 15 June 1970
- Rhein-Main Air Base, Germany, c. 11 April 2003 – 2004
- Incirlik Air Base, Turkey, by September 2006-c. 1 April 2014

=== Aircraft ===
- Boeing B-17 Flying Fortress, 1943–1945
- Fairchild C-119 Flying Boxcar, 1953–1959
- Lockheed C-130 Hercules, 1958–1970
- Boeing C-17 Globemaster III, 2006–2014

=== Awards and campaigns ===
| Award streamer | Award | Dates | Notes |
|---|---|---|---|
| | Distinguished Unit Citation | 18 July 1944 | Germany, 817th Bombardment Squadron |
| | Distinguished Unit Citation | 24 March 1945 | Germany, 817th Bombardment Squadron |
| | Presidential Unit Citation | 8 August 1967-7 August 1968 | Vietnam, 817th Troop Carrier Squadron (later 817th Tactical Airlift Squadron) |
| | Air Force Outstanding Unit Award with Combat "V" Device | 1 September 1968-15 June 1970 | 817th Tactical Airlift Squadron |
| | Air Force Meritorious Unit Award | 1 June 2010-31 May 2011 | 817th Expeditionary Airlift Squadron |
| | Air Force Outstanding Unit Award | 6 May 1953-10 September 1954 | 817th Troop Carrier Squadron |
| | Air Force Outstanding Unit Award | 1 January-30 June 1961 | 817th Troop Carrier Squadron |
| | Air Force Outstanding Unit Award | 1 July 1964-30 April 1966 | 817th Troop Carrier Squadron |
| | Air Force Outstanding Unit Award | 8 August 1966-7 August 1967 | 817th Troop Carrier Squadron |
| | Air Force Outstanding Unit Award | 1 October 2006-30 September 2007 | 817th Expeditionary Airlift Squadron |
| | Air Force Outstanding Unit Award | 1 October 2007-30 September 2008 | 817th Expeditionary Airlift Squadron |
| | Air Force Outstanding Unit Award | 1 October 2008-30 September 2009 | 817th Expeditionary Airlift Squadron |
| | Republic of Korea Presidential Unit Citation | 1 January 1953-28 July 1953 | 817th Troop Carrier Squadron |
| | Republic of Vietnam Gallantry Cross with Palm | 1 September 1969-15 June 1970 | 817th Tactical Airlift Squadron |

| Campaign Streamer | Campaign | Dates | Notes |
|---|---|---|---|
| | Air Offensive, Europe | 9 April 1944 – 5 June 1944 | 817th Bombardment Squadron |
| | Normandy | 6 June 1944 – 24 July 1944 | 817th Bombardment Squadron |
| | Northern France | 25 July 1944 – 14 September 1944 | 817th Bombardment Squadron |
| | Rome-Arno | 22 January 1944 – 9 September 1944 | 817th Bombardment Squadron |
| | Southern France | 15 August 1944 – 14 September 1944 | 817th Bombardment Squadron |
| | North Apennines | 10 September 1944 – 4 April 1945 | 817th Bombardment Squadron |
| | Po Valley | 3 April 1945 – 8 May 1945 | 817th Bombardment Squadron |
| | Rhineland | 15 September 1944 – 21 March 1945 | 817th Bombardment Squadron |
| | Central Europe | 9 April 1944 – 21 May 1945 | 817th Bombardment Squadron |
| | Air Combat, EAME Theater | 9 April 1944 – 11 May 1945 | 817th Bombardment Squadron |
| | Third Korean Winter | 1 January 1953 – 30 April 1953 | 817th Troop Carrier Squadron |
| | Korea Summer-Fall 1953 | 1 May 1953 – 27 July 1953 | 817th Troop Carrier Squadron |

== See also ==
- Boeing B-17 Flying Fortress Units of the Mediterranean Theater of Operations
