= Ragged Island, Bahamas =

District of Ragged Island
- Island
- Coordinates: 22°13′N 75°44′W
- Country: Bahamas

Government
  - Type: District Council

Area
  - Total: 23 km^{2} (8.9 sq mi)

Population (2022)
  - Total: 44
  - Density: 1.9/km^{2} (5.0/sq mi)
- Time zone: UTC−5 (EST)
  - Summer (DST): UTC−4 (EDT)

Ragged Island is a 23 km^{2} (8.9 mi^{2}) island and district in the southern Bahamas. Ragged Island is part of the Jumentos Cays and Ragged Island Chain. The crescent-shaped chain measures over 180 km (110 mi) in length and includes cays known as Raccoon Cay, Hog Cay and Double-Breasted Cay. Island ownership is stated to have been granted to William George Lockhart some time in the 18th century. On 8 September 2017, Duncan Town took a direct hit from Hurricane Irma.

== Etymology ==
The indigenous Lucayan people called the Ragged Islands Utiaquia, meaning "western hutia land". Spanish explorers named the islands Islas de Arena ("sand islands").

== Economy ==
Until recently the island had an active salt industry, the salt ponds having been developed in the 19th century by Duncan Taylor, after whom Duncan Town, the only settlement, is named.

Due to the decline of the salt industry, which had peaked in the 1930s, there has been a gradual emigration to more prosperous islands such as New Providence, Grand Bahama Island, Abaco Island, The Exumas and Eleuthera.

== Population and people ==
The population of Ragged Island in the 2010 census was 72. Senator Mizpah Tertullien was born on the island in 1930.

=== Duncan Town ===
Duncan Town is the only settlement in the entire Ragged Island chain and is situated within a bay of shallow water. The island contains a small airstrip, a harbor, and a lighthouse. A tower on the south end of the island is visible from ships transiting the Old Bahama Channel.

Most of the inhabitants on the island are direct descendants of the original settlers and they bear their original family names, such as Moxey, Curling, Lockhart, Maycock, Munroe, Joffre, Wallace, and Wilson. One of the surnames Maycock originated from Maycock Cay. The familiar heritage and their remoteness have resulted in the islands being part of the “family islands” or “out island”. Although the island is remote and sparsely populated, many of its descendants have taken important roles within sailing & maritime affairs, politics, athletics, entertainment, and business.

In September 2017, the prime minister invoked a mandatory evacuation order for all members of the community to leave the island to allow for cleanup and the restoration of services, following a devastating hit by Hurricane Irma. Eighteen residents who had not evacuated before the storm were affected by the request, which included the offer of an airlift to New Providence. The prime minister subsequently offered to consider redevelopment of a more robust community if residents were agreeable.

As of March 2019, there are only limited attempts at restoring the island. In a speech on March 19, the prime minister evaded reporters' questions concerning the proposed solar farm for the island. Construction of the solar farm began in December 2019. With the battery storage system finalized, the system is expected to supply at least 90% of the island's energy needs. The solar field was essentially completed in early February 2020 and was commissioned by the end of February.

== Communications ==
In August 2005, a contract was signed with TYCO International to deploy a fiber-optic submarine cable in a self-healing ring topology, connecting 14 islands of the Bahamas (New Providence, Andros, Eleuthera, Exuma, Long Island, Ragged Island, Inagua, Mayaguana, San Salvador, Rum Cay, Cat Island, Abaco, Crooked Island and Grand Bahama) at a cost of $60 million.

== Transportation ==
The island relies on the "mail boat" for transportation to and from the major islands as well as for freight and commerce.

The island is also served by Duncan Town Airport. Upgrades to the Duncan Town Airport (funded by the European Union) were commenced in 2006 at a cost of $650,000.

The dredging and construction of a dock in Ragged Island commenced in 2006 at an estimated cost of some $3.5 million.

== Politics ==
For elections to the House of Assembly of the Bahamas, Ragged Island is in the constituency "The Exumas and Ragged Island".

== Little Ragged Island ==
This island of 730 acres is privately owned, and was listed for sale in March 2021 according to CNN.
