= Mitzpe =

Mitzpe, a Hebrew word meaning lookout, may refer to the following places in Israel:

- Mitzpe Aviv
- Mitzpe Dani
- Mitzpe Eshtemoa
- Mitzpe Hagit
- Mitzpe Hila
- Mitzpe Ilan
- Mitzpe Kramim
- Mitzpe Netofa
- Mitzpe Ramon
- Mitzpe Shalem
- Mitzpe Yair
- Mitzpe Yeriho
- Mitzpe Yosef

== See also ==
- Mizpah (disambiguation)
