= Mizpah (aircraft) =

B-17G bomber that lost its nose to flak over Budapest in 1944

- Mizpah on 14 July 1944 after sustaining damage over Hungary (Note: This photo appears in various online sources as being of Mizpah, although the aircraft cannot be definitively identified via its markings, as some details have been removed, apparently by wartime censors. Significantly, the vertical stabilizer has been blacked out—for a B-17 of the 483d Bombardment Group, it would have had a "Y" high on the tail with a five-pointed star underneath (see: USAAF unit identification aircraft markings). The uncropped source photo carries a margin note stating "Print rec'd 7/18/44 from BPR. Stamped: Passed for Publication, Field Press Censor.")

General information
- Type: Boeing B-17G Flying Fortress
- Manufacturer: Boeing
- Owners: USAAF
- Serial: 42-32109

History
- Manufactured: January 1944
- In service: 1944
- Fate: Lost in action 14 July 1944; 82 years ago

Mizpah (serial number 42-32109) (Note: At least four other B-17 carried the name Mizpah, including 41-24453 and 41-24497 (Mizpah II) of the 91st Bombardment Group and 42-31575 of the 381st Bombardment Group.) was a B-17G Flying Fortress heavy bomber of the United States Army Air Forces. On 14 July 1944, during a mission against Budapest, an 88mm anti aircraft shell exploded in its nose, killing two crew members. Despite the absence of much of the nose, the pilot kept the aircraft flying long enough for the remaining eight airmen to bail out; all survived.

== Aircraft ==
Mizpah was built by Boeing as a B-17G-35-BO. It was delivered at Cheyenne, Wyoming, on 24 January 1944 and assigned to the 840th Bomb Squadron, 483rd Bomb Group at Tortorella, Italy, on 13 March 1944. The name is biblical from the cairn of Mizpah in the Book of Genesis.

== Final mission ==
On 14 July 1944, the 483rd Bomb Group attacked rail targets at Budapest. After the bomb run, a flak shell hit the nose of Mizpah, which was flying in the number two position of its formation. Crews in neighboring aircraft reported the nose section peeling away. The blast killed the navigator and the bombardier.

The pilot reported that five of the crew, located in the back of the aircraft, bailed out "as soon as we were hit", with the pilot, co-pilot, and engineer remaining in the damaged aircraft. The approximate location where the five crew bailed out was 47°27′N 19°04′E, which corresponds to the northern part of Csepel Island just south of Budapest.

The pilot, co-pilot, and engineer kept the bomber flying but struggled to move the tail's elevator trim to stabilize the aircraft. They eventually bailed out, per the pilot's report, approximately 100 miles (160 km) south-southwest of Budapest. The bomber crashed near the town of Solt. Each of the crew who bailed out survived; all eight were captured and sent to prisoner-of-war camps where they remained until being liberated on 30 April 1945.

=== Crew ===
The ten-member crew was as follows:

Position	Rank	Name	City of next of kin
Pilot	1st Lt	Ewald A. Swanson	Escanaba, Michigan
Co-pilot	2nd Lt	Paul W. Berndt	Beloit, Wisconsin
Navgator	2nd Lt	Joseph H. Henderson Jr.†	Dallas, Texas
Bombardier	2nd Lt	Kenneth W. Dudley†	Detroit, Michigan
Engineer	T/Sgt	Frank V. Gramenzi	Camden, New Jersey
Asst. Engineer	S/Sgt	Dale R. Hish	Virginia, Illinois
Radio Operator	T/Sgt	George J. Simonelli	Jersey City, New Jersey
Armorer Gunner	S/Sgt	Charles W. Bell Jr.	Memphis, Tennessee
Asst. Armorer Gunner	S/Sgt	Arnold R. Kelley	Brooklyn, New York
Asst. Radio Operator	S/Sgt	Wesley D. Tucker	Davenport, Iowa

† Killed in action

== See also ==
- Air warfare of World War II
- B-17 Flying Fortress units of the United States Army Air Forces
- Old 666
- The Swoose
