= 483rd Airlift Group =

483d Airlift Group
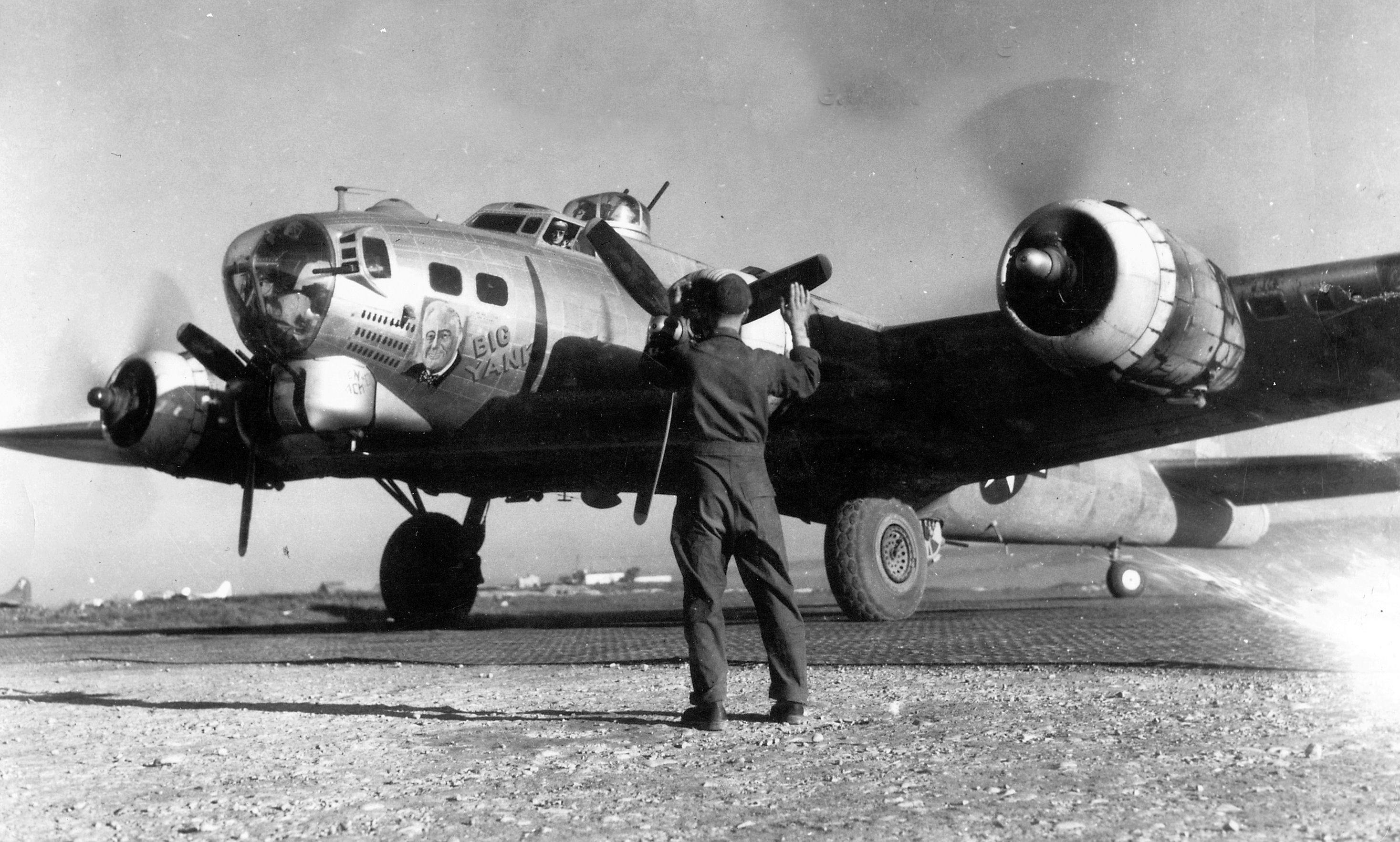
- 840th Bombardment Squadron B-17 Flying Fortress (Note: Aircraft is Douglas Long Beach B-17G-50-DL Fortress serial 44-6405 "Big Yank". The crew of this plane were credited with 3 Messerschmitt Me 262 kills and one probable on 24 March 1945. The aircraft was salvaged at Walnut Ridge, Arkansas on 28 December 1945.)
- Active: 1943–1945, 1953–1958, 1991–1992
- Country: United States
- Branch: United States Air Force
- Role: Airlift
- Part of: Pacific Air Forces
- Motto: Efficient Airlift Support
- Engagements: Mediterranean Theater of Operations; Korean War
- Decorations: Distinguished Unit Citation; Air Force Outstanding Unit Award; Republic of Korea Presidential Unit Citation

Insignia
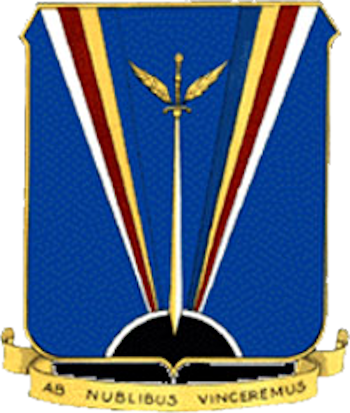
- Emblem of the 483d Bombardment Group

The 483d Airlift Group is an inactive unit last assigned to Pacific Air Forces at Osan AB Korea. It was assigned to Twenty-Second Air Force as a VIP transport unit for Headquarters, Seventh Air Force. It was inactivated on 1 June 1992.

During World War II, the 483d Bombardment Group was the last B-17 Flying Fortress unit trained in the United States. It was deployed to Fifteenth Air Force in the Mediterranean Theater of Operations in 1944. It was later re-activated during the Korean War as a troop carrier group.

== History ==
=== World War II ===
The group was constituted as 483d Bombardment Group (Heavy) on 14 September 1943 and activated on 20 September. Its original squadrons were the newly activated 815th, 816th, 817th Bombardment Squadrons, and the 818th Bombardment Squadron, which moved from Gulfport Army Air Field, where it had been performing anti-submarine warfare as the 21st Antisubmarine Squadron' to join the group at Ephrata Army Air Base. The group trained with Boeing B-17 Flying Fortresses under Third Air Force in Florida. While in training at MacDill Field, the 818th Bombardment Squadron and the 840th Bombardment Squadron, assigned to the 488th Bombardment Group, swapped designations.

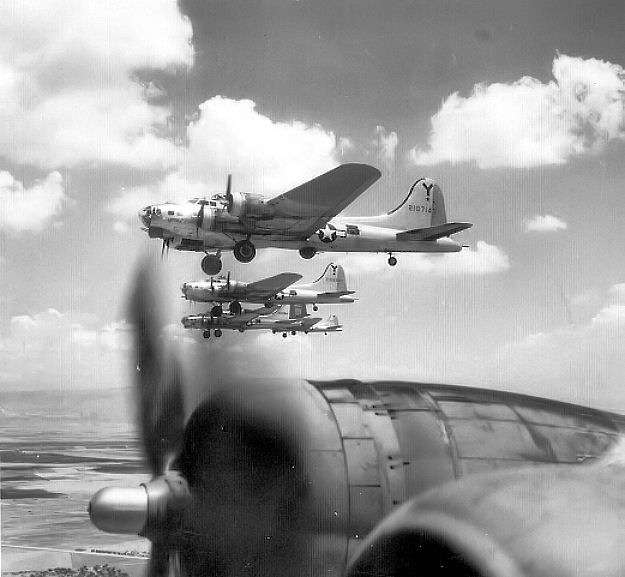
B-17s of the 483d Bombardment Group in formation during a combat mission (Note: Note the "Y" tail code, red painted rudder on the vertical stabilizers.)

The 483d deployed to the Mediterranean Theater of Operations, assigned to Fifteenth Air Force in Southern Italy. It began operations in April 1944 and engaged in long-range strategic bombardment of enemy military, industrial and transport targets, including oil refineries and production oilfields in Italy, France. Southern Germany, Austria, Czechoslovakia, and the Balkans.

On 14 July 1944, during a mission over Budapest, one of the group's B-17s, Mizpah, lost most of its nose due to flak, which also killed two members of the crew. Despite significant damage, the pilot was able to keep the aircraft flying for several minutes, allowing the remaining crew to bail out successfully. For action on 18 July 1944, the group received a Distinguished Unit Citation (DUC) as, without cover from its fighter escort, the group engaged numerous enemy aircraft in the target area and bombed the objective, an airdrome and installations at Memmingen, despite losing 15 bombers.

Assisting the strategic bombardment of enemy industry, the group received another DUC for braving fighter assaults and antiaircraft fire to bomb tank factories at Berlin on 24 March 1945. It struck targets in southern France in preparation for Operation Dragoon, the invasion in August 1944. The group also operated in support of ground force in northern Italy during the Allied offensive in April 1945 and continued strategic bombardment until German capitulation in May 1945.

After V-E Day, assisted with Air Transport Command's Green Project which was the movement of troops from Pisa Airfield to a staging area in Morocco in preparation for return to the United States. The group's B-17s were disarmed with flooring and seats for 25 passengers installed. The flight crew for this operation consisted of a pilot, copilot, navigator and flight engineer. The 483d carried passengers from Pisa to Port Lyautey Airfield, French Morocco where ATC transports moved them across the Atlantic or to Dakar for movement via South Atlantic Transport Route. The group was inactivated in Italy on 25 September 1945. It flew 215 combat missions and 75 aircraft lost.

=== Korean War ===
The group was once again activated at Ashiya Air Base, Japan as the 483d Troop Carrier Group on 1 January 1953 and replaced the 403d Troop Carrier Group and absorbed its mission, personnel and equipment. The group was assigned to the 483d Troop Carrier Wing and controlled the wing's operational squadrons.

It performed troop carrier and air transport operations in the Far East, including landing of troops and cargo in forward areas of the combat zone, air transportation of airborne troops and equipment, and air evacuation of casualties. It received a Korean Presidential Unit Citation for these actions. For its actions in transporting United Nations troops in Korea and training with airborne units, the group was one of the first units to earn an Air Force Outstanding Unit Award. Between April 1953 and September 1954, the wing aided the French Air Force in Indochina by training personnel and hauling supplies. In 1956, the group became non-operational and its squadrons were attached to the 483d Troop Carrier Wing as Far East Air Forces began to convert to the dual-deputy organizational model. It was inactivated in 1958 as the conversion was complete and its squadrons reassigned to the wing.

The group was briefly reactivated in the early 1990s as the 483d Airlift Group of Military Airlift Command at Osan Air Base, Korea as VIP airlift units were being realigned.

=== Lineage ===
- Constituted as the 483d Bombardment Group (Heavy) on 14 September 1943

Activated on 20 September 1943
Redesignated 483d Bombardment Group, Heavy on 25 January 1944
Inactivated 25 September 1945

- Redesignated 483d Troop Carrier Group, Medium on 15 November 1952

Activated on 1 January 1953
Inactivated on 8 December 1958 (not operational after 15 March 1956)

- Redesignated 483d Airlift Group

Activated c. 1 September 1991
Inactivated c. 1 June 1992

=== Assignments ===
- Fourth Air Force, 20 September – 7 November 1943
- Third Air Force, 7 November 1943 – 2 March 1944
- 5th Bombardment Wing, 17 March 1944 – 25 September 1945
- 483d Troop Carrier Wing, 1 January 1953 – 8 December 1958
- Twenty-Second Air Force, 1 September 1991 – 1 June 1992

=== Components ===
- 21st Troop Carrier Squadron: 18 Sep 1956 – 8 Dec 1958 (attached to 374th Troop Carrier Wing, 18 Sep 1956 – 1 July 1957, 483d Troop Carrier Wing, − 8 Feb 1958)
- 815th Bombardment Squadron (later 815th Troop Carrier Squadron): 20 Sep 1943 – 25 Sep 1945; 1 Jan 1953 – 8 Dec 1958 (attached to 483d Troop Carrier Wing after 15 March 1956)
- 816th Bombardment Squadron (later 816th Troop Carrier Squadron): 20 Sep 1943 – 25 Sep 1945; 1 Jan 1953 – 8 Dec 1958 (attached to 483d Troop Carrier Wing after 15 March 1956)
- 817th Bombardment Squadron (later 817th Troop Carrier Squadron): 20 Sep 1943 – 25 Sep 1945; 1 Jan 1953 – 8 Dec 1958 (attached to 483d Troop Carrier Wing after 15 March 1956)
- 818th Bombardment Squadron (later 840th Bombardment Squadron): 20 Sep 1943 – 25 Sep 1945

=== Stations ===
- Ephrata Army Air Base, Washington, 20 September 1943
- MacDill Field, Florida 7 November 1943 – 2 March 1944
- Tortorella Airfield, Italy 30 March 1944
- Sterparone Airfield, Italy 22 April 1944
- Pisa Airport, Italy 15 May – 25 September 1945
- Ashiya Air Base, Japan, 1 January 1953 – 8 December 1958
- Osan Air Base, South Korea. 1 September 1991 – 1 June 1992

=== Aircraft ===
- Boeing B-17 Flying Fortress, 1943–1945
- Fairchild C-119 Flying Boxcar, 1951–1959

=== Awards and citations ===
Award streamer	Award	Dates	Notes
	Distinguished Unit Citation	18 July 1944	Germany, 483d Bombardment Group
	Distinguished Unit Citation	24 March 1945	Germany, 483d Bombardment Group
	Air Force Outstanding Unit Award	6 May 1953-10 September 1954	483d Troop Carrier Group
	Republic of Korea Presidential Unit Citation	1 January 1953-28 July 1953	483d Troop Carrier Group

Campaign Streamer	Campaign	Dates	Notes
	Air Offensive, Europe	9 April 1944 – 5 June 1944	483d Bombardment Group
	Normandy	6 June 1944 – 24 July 1944	483d Bombardment Group
	Northern France	25 July 1944 – 14 September 1944	483d Bombardment Group
	Rome-Arno	22 January 1944 – 9 September 1944	483d Bombardment Group
	Southern France	15 August 1944 – 14 September 1944	483d Bombardment Group
	North Apennines	10 September 1944 – 4 April 1945	483d Bombardment Group
	Po Valley	3 April 1945 – 8 May 1945	483d Bombardment Group
	Rhineland	15 September 1944 – 21 March 1945	483d Bombardment Group
	Central Europe	9 April 1944 – 21 May 1945	483d Bombardment Group
	Air Combat, EAME Theater	9 April 1944 – 11 May 1945	483d Bombardment Group
	Third Korean Winter	1 January 1953 – 30 April 1953	483d Troop Carrier Group
	Korea Summer-Fall 1953	1 May 1953 – 27 July 1953	483d Troop Carrier Group
