= 128th Airborne Command and Control Squadron =

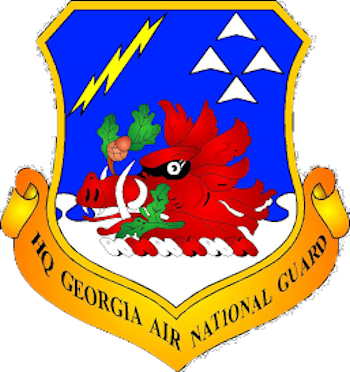
128th Airborne Command and Control Squadron

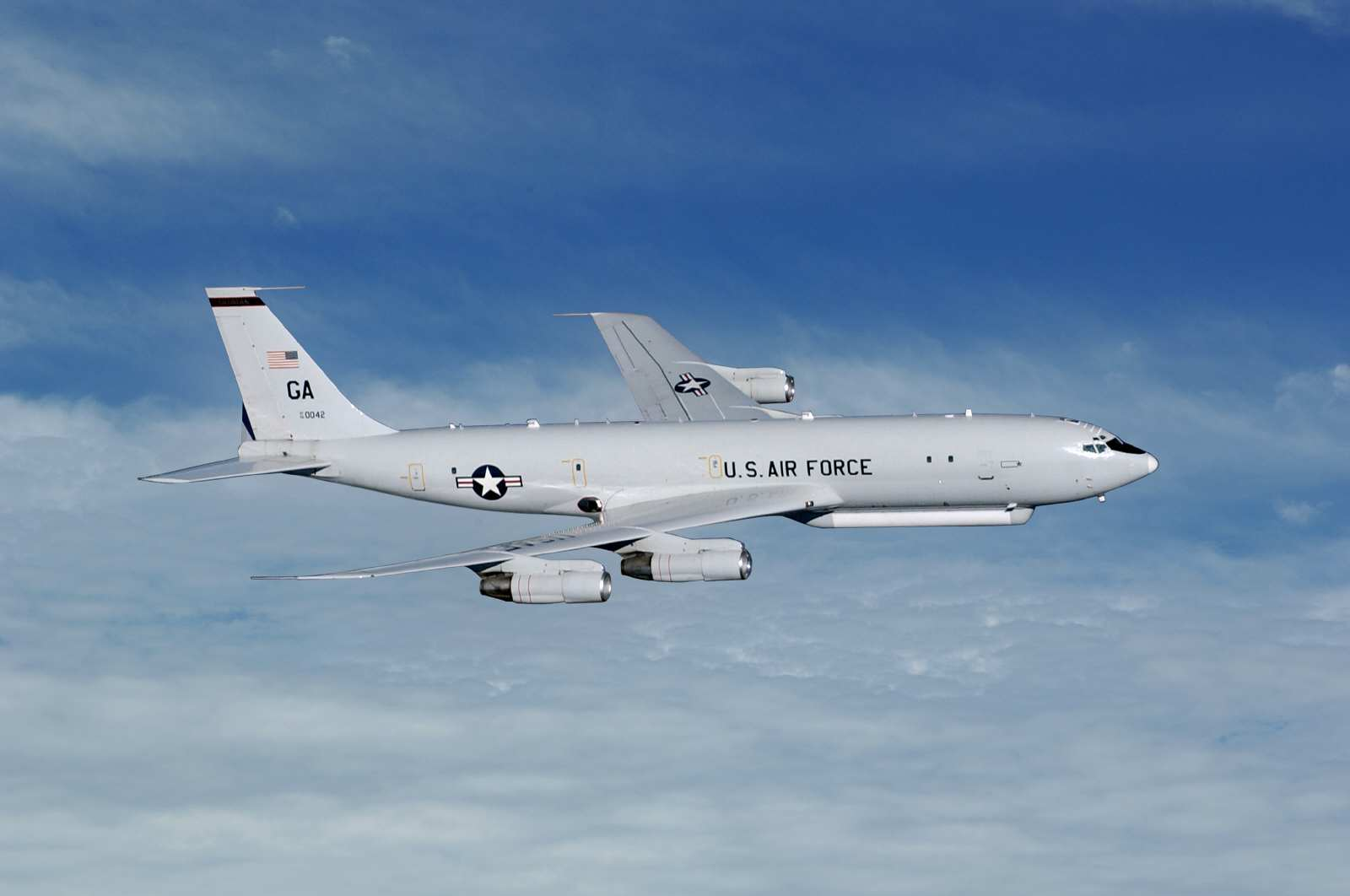
- 128th E-8C Joint STARS (Note: Aircraft is Northrop Grumman E-8C JSTARS, serial 96-0042. This aircraft was formerly Canadian Armed Forces Boeing CC-137, serial 13705. Baugher, Joe (21 April 2023). "1996 USAF Serial Numbers". Joe Baugher.)
- Active: 1918–1919; 1941–1945; 1946–1952; 1952–2002; 2002–2011; 2011–present
- Country: United States
- Allegiance: Georgia (U.S. state)
- Branch: Air National Guard
- Type: Squadron
- Role: Airborne command and control
- Part of: Georgia Air National Guard
- Garrison/HQ: Robins Air Force Base, Georgia
- Engagements: World War I European Theater of Operations; Korean War; Vietnam War; Operation Desert Storm; Kosovo; Operation Enduring Freedom; Operation Iraqi Freedom
- Decorations: Distinguished Unit Citation

Insignia
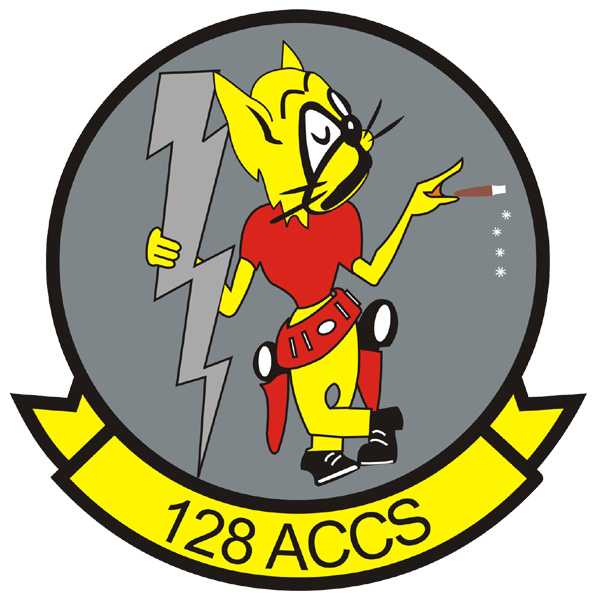
- 128th Airborne Command and Control Squadron emblem

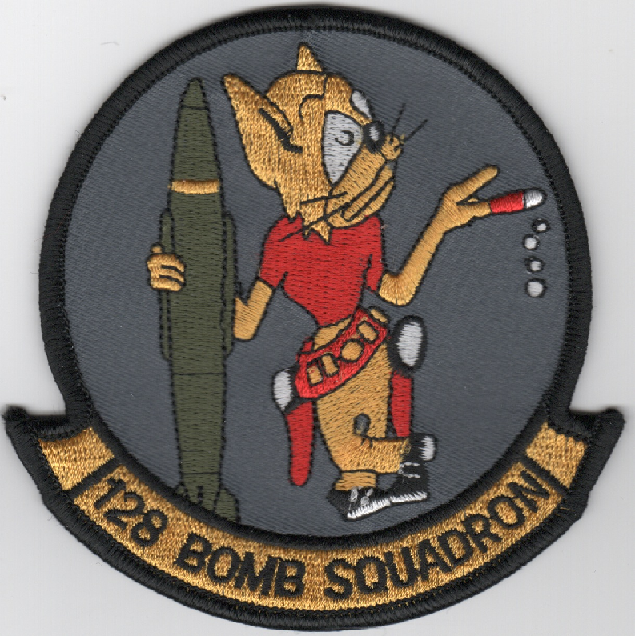
- 128th Bomb Squadron emblem

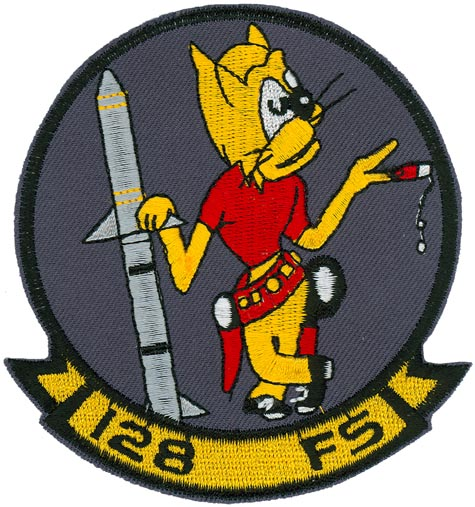
- 128th Fighter-Interceptor Squadron emblem

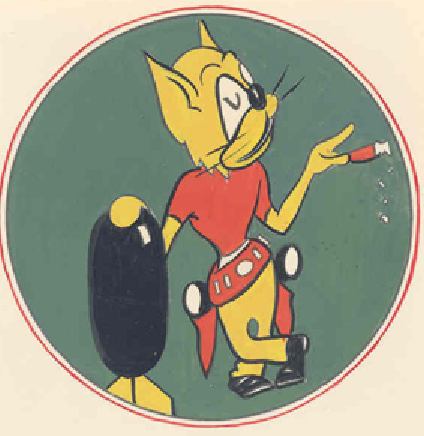
- 818th Bombardment Squadron emblem (Note: Approved 12 January 1944. Description: On a grayed green disc, thin border triparted orange, white and black, a nonchalant, caricatured wild cat yellow orange, outlined black, wearing an orange jersey, yellow orange trousers, black shoes, yellow orange cartridge belt supporting two black and white revolvers in orange holsters, legs crossed and leaning on a black aerial bomb, resting on yellow tail fins, while flicking ashes from an orange cigar with white tip, held in left forepaw. This emblem was reinstated for the 128th Fighter-Bomber Squadron and 128th Tactical Fighter Squadron.)
- Tail code: GA

The 128th Airborne Command and Control Squadron is a unit of the Georgia Air National Guard 116th Air Control Wing located at Robins Air Force Base, Georgia. The 128th is equipped with the E-8C Joint STARS.

The squadron's first predecessor is the World War I 840th Aero Squadron, which was organized on 1 February 1918 and, after training in Texas, served in France as a depot unit. It returned to the United States in the March 1919 and was demobilized .

The 128th Observation Squadron was allotted to the Georgia National Guard and was organized in May 1941. Four months later it was mobilized, and trained in aerial reconnaissance. In June 1942, the squadron began antisubmarine patrol missions over the Gulf of Mexico, being redesignated as the 21st Antisubmarine Squadron in the spring of 1943. After the Navy assumed control of the squadron's mission, it began training as a heavy bomber unit as the 818th, then the 840th Bombardment Squadron. It deployed to the Mediterranean Theater of Operations in 1944, and engaged in strategic bombing until the end of World War II, earning two Distinguished Unit Citations before being inactivated in September 1945 at Pisa Airport, Italy. During the war, it was consolidated with the World War I aero squadron.

In May 1946, the squadron was allotted to the National Guard as the 128th Fighter Squadron. It was mobilized again for the Korean War, but deployed to France to reinforce United States Air Forces Europe's fighter force. When its activation was ended in July 1942, it was inactivated and transferred its personnel and planes to the 494th Fighter-Bomber Squadron, activating the same day in the Georgia Air National Guard as the 128th Fighter-Bomber Squadron. The squadron trained as a fighter unit until 1961, when it assumed the airlift mission as the 128th Air Transport Squadron. In 1973, the squadron returned to the fighter mission as the 128th Tactical Fighter Squadron. It became the 128th Bomb Squadron in 1996, and assumed its current role in 2003.

== History ==
=== World War I ===
The 128th Airborne Command and Control Squadron traces its origins to the 840th Aero Squadron, which was organized at Rich Field, Waco, Texas on 4 February 1918. However, the 840th's history itself dates to the middle of December 1917 when many of the squadron members first enlisted in the Army at Fort Slocum, New York and the Columbus Barracks, Ohio. Just before Christmas, 1917, the men were transported to Kelly Field, near San Antonio, Texas where they began indoctrination into the Army as an unorganized unit. Many men were transferred into and out of the unit in its first weeks at Kelly. On 8 January, the men was transferred to Rich Field, and placed in temporary squadrons. Time was taken up by drills, hikes, physical training and other exercises. Also the men attended various lectures about military courtesies and customs. Finally, on 4 February 150 men from the group were selected and formed into the 840th Aero Squadron.

After several more weeks of Army indoctrination training, the squadron was ordered for overseas service, being transferred to the Aviation Concentration Center, Garden City, Long Island. It arrived at Mineola Field on 4 March 1918 where it was prepared and equipped for overseas duty. On 15 April, the squadron was ordered to the port of embarkation, Hoboken, New Jersey, where it boarded the former White Star Line liner SS Canopic. After an uneventful Atlantic crossing, the squadron arrived at Liverpool, England where it boarded a train headed south to Winchester, where it arrived at the Romney Rest Camp. There, the 840th was detached to the Royal Flying Corps for technical training, arriving at the No. 3 Western Aircraft Depot, RFC Yatesbury, Wiltshire, on 4 May. There squadron personnel were placed in different departments of the depot and were engaged in the production and repair of airplanes. The 840th was the second American squadron assigned to the depot, and there was quite a curiosity by the English about them. The men were warmly received in the villages around the depot and celebrated the 4th of July in Bristol. On 13 August, training ended and the squadron moved to Southampton for transport across the English Channel to France.

The 840th arrived at Le Havre, France on 18 August, where the squadron was greeted by a German air-raid on its "rest" camp. The squadron was hurriedly moved during the raid to a race track, where some ammunition was stored. However, after the "All Clear" was given, it returned to its barracks. After three days, the squadron was transported to Courban Aerodrome, in eastern France where it was assigned to the No. 3 Aircraft Depot, Independent Air Force, RAF. There, the squadron began work on Handley Page and de Havilland planes. The squadron had the distinction of turning out the first Handley Page aircraft to be assembled in France. It also saw its first United States-built Liberty Engine at the depot. The 840th was one of only three Air Service squadrons assigned to the British depot. The squadron remained at Courban until the end of the war. The squadron turned out two squadrons of Dayton-Wright DH-4 aircraft, prepared for the attack on Metz that was about to commence at the time of the Armistice.

The squadron was moved to Latrecey Aerodrome, on 20 November 1918 where it waited for orders to return home. It finally moved to the port of Brest on 1 February, where it sailed on a troop ship for the United States, moving to Langley Field, Virginia in early March 1919. There the squadron was demobilized and returned to civilian life.

=== World War II ===
==== Antisubmarine operations ====
The 128th Observation Squadron was allotted to the Georgia National Guard, activated in May 1941 at Atlanta Airport as an army observation squadron, and equipped with several types of observation aircraft. The squadron was called into federal service in September 1941 and assigned to II Air Support Command, which moved it to Lawson Field, Georgia as the United States mobilized prior to World War II. It continued to train as an observation unit after the Pearl Harbor Attack, standardizing on North American O-47s, until June 1942.

On 20 June 1942, the squadron moved to New Orleans Army Air Base, Louisiana, where it was attached to the Gulf Task Force and began antisubmarine patrols over the Gulf of Mexico. It was attached to Army Air Forces Antisubmarine Command in the fall of 1942, and was assigned to the command in March 1943, when it was redesignated the 21st Antisubmarine Squadron. 1943 also saw the conversion of the squadron to the more capable North American B-25 Mitchell.

The squadron moved to Gulfport Army Air Field, Mississippi in May 1943 and ended antisubmarine operations. In July 1943, the Army Air Forces and the Navy reached an agreement to transfer the coastal antisubmarine mission to the Navy. This mission transfer also included an exchange of AAF long-range bombers equipped for antisubmarine warfare for Navy Consolidated B-24 Liberators without such equipment.

==== Heavy bomber operations ====
Like many antisubmarine units flying heavy bombers, the 21st became part of Second Air Force. It moved to Ephrata Army Air Base as the 818th Bombardment Squadron (Heavy) on 28 September 1943, where it became the 818th Bombardment Squadron, helping form the cadre for the new 483d Bombardment Group. In November, the squadron moved to MacDill Field, Florida, where it trained with Flying Fortresses under Third Air Force. At MacDill, it exchanged designations with another squadron, becoming the 840th Bombardment Squadron, and was consolidated with the World War I 840th Aero Squadron.

The 840th deployed to the Mediterranean Theater of Operations, where it became part of Fifteenth Air Force at Sterparone Airfield in Southern Italy. The squadron's air element flew its Flying Fortresses to Sterparone via Tortorella Airfield, while the ground element moved to Sterparone via troop ship. It began operations in April 1944 with an attack on a cement factory in Split, Yugoslavia.

The squadron engaged in long-range strategic bombardment of enemy military, industrial and transport targets, including factories, oil refineries, marshalling yards, airfields, and troop concentrations in Italy, France. Southern Germany, Austria, Czechoslovakia, and the Balkans. In June 1944, the squadron participated in a shuttle mission, departing Italy and landing in the Soviet Union, attacking targets en route and on the return flight. This enabled attacks on targets too far from the squadron's base to strike and return home. The squadron received a Distinguished Unit Citation for combat action two months later. On 18 July 1944 the squadron, along with the other elements of the 483d Group, bombed the objective, an airfield and installations at Memmingen, engaging numerous enemy aircraft in the target area despite a lack of cover from its planned fighter escort. It received a second citation for braving fighter assaults and flak to bomb tank factories at Berlin on 24 March 1945.

The squadron was occasionally diverted from the strategic attack on Germany. It struck targets in southern France in preparation for Operation Dragoon, the invasion of August 1944. The group also supported ground forces in northern Italy during the Allied offensive in April 1945.

After V-E Day, the unit moved to Pisa Airfield, where it operated under the control of Air Transport Command's Green Project which was the movement of troops back to the United States. The squadron carried troops from Pisa to a staging area in Morocco. Its B-17s were disarmed with flooring and seats for 25 passengers installed. It carried passengers from Pisa to Port Lyautey Airfield, French Morocco for further movement them across the Atlantic. The squadron was inactivated in Italy in September 1945.

=== Georgia Air National Guard ===
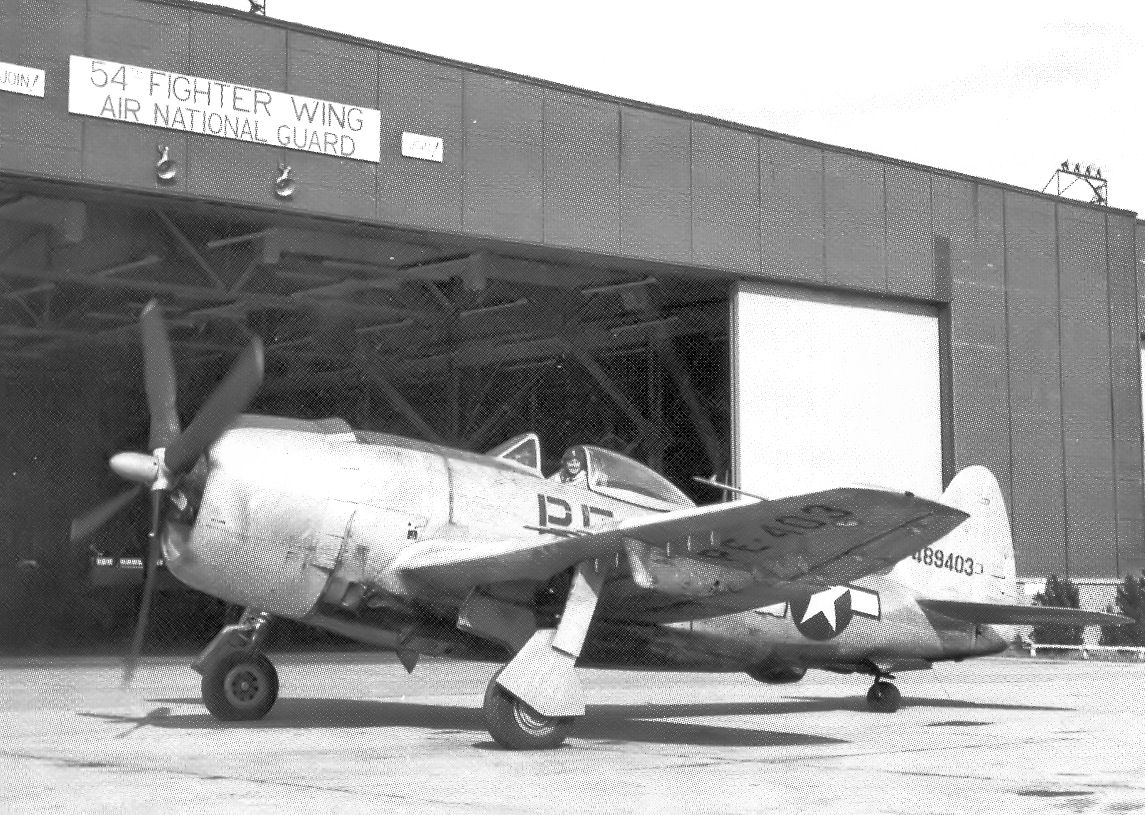
128th Fighter Squadron Republic P-47N Thunderbolt (Note: Aircraft is Republic P-47N-25-RE Thunderbolt, serial 44-89403 at Marietta AAF, GA in May 1946. This aircraft was part of the last production block of P-47s at Republic Aircraft, Farmingdale, Long Island.)

The wartime 840th Bombardment Squadron was re-activated and re-designated as the 128th Fighter Squadron, and was allotted to the Georgia Air National Guard, on 24 May 1946. It was organized at Marietta Army Airfield, Georgia, and was extended federal recognition on 20 August 1946 by the National Guard Bureau. The 128th Fighter Squadron was entitled to the history, honors, and colors of the 840th Bombardment Squadron.

The squadron was equipped with Republic F-47 Thunderbolts and was temporarily assigned to the 54th Fighter Wing on 20 August, then permanently to the 116th Fighter Group on 9 September 1946. The 116th Fighter Group consisted of the 128th and the 158th Fighter Squadron at Chatham Army Air Field, near Savannah. As part of the Continental Air Command Fourteenth Air Force, the unit trained for tactical fighter missions and air-to-air combat.

==== Korean War federalization ====
The 128th was federalized on 10 October 1950 due to the Korean War. It was assigned to the federalized Oklahoma Air National Guard 137th Fighter-Bomber Wing and equipped with Republic F-84G Thunderjets. Along with the Oklahoma 125th Fighter Squadron and Kansas Air National Guard 127th Fighter Squadron, the wing was scheduled for deployment to the new Chaumont-Semoutiers Air Base, France, as part of the United States Air Forces in Europe (USAFE).

By 27 November, the wing assembled at Alexandria Air Force Base, Louisiana for conversion training in the newer F-84Gs. Deployment of the wing was delayed, however, by the need to transfer pilots to Korea from training and delays in receiving engines for the F-84Gs, as well as the ongoing construction at Chaumont Air Base. Training and delays continued throughout 1951. Due to these delays, many of the activated National Guard airmen were released from active duty and never deployed to France.

With mostly regular Air Force personnel and all the delays behind them, the remaining Guardsmen departed Louisiana on 5 May 1952 for Europe; however, the 128th inherited a base that was little more than acres of mud where wheat fields used to be. The only hardened facilities at Chaumont were a concrete runway and a handful of tar-paper shacks. The 128th wound up being stationed by USAFE at Neubiberg Air Base, West Germany until the facilities in France were suitable for military use. The aircraft arrived at Chaumont on 25 June, being the first USAF tactical air fighters to be based permanently in France, albeit working mostly in tents and temporary wooden buildings on their new base.

The Guardsmen of the 128th ended their active-duty tour in France and returned to the United States in late June, leaving their F-84 Thunderjets in Europe.

==== Air Defense Command ====
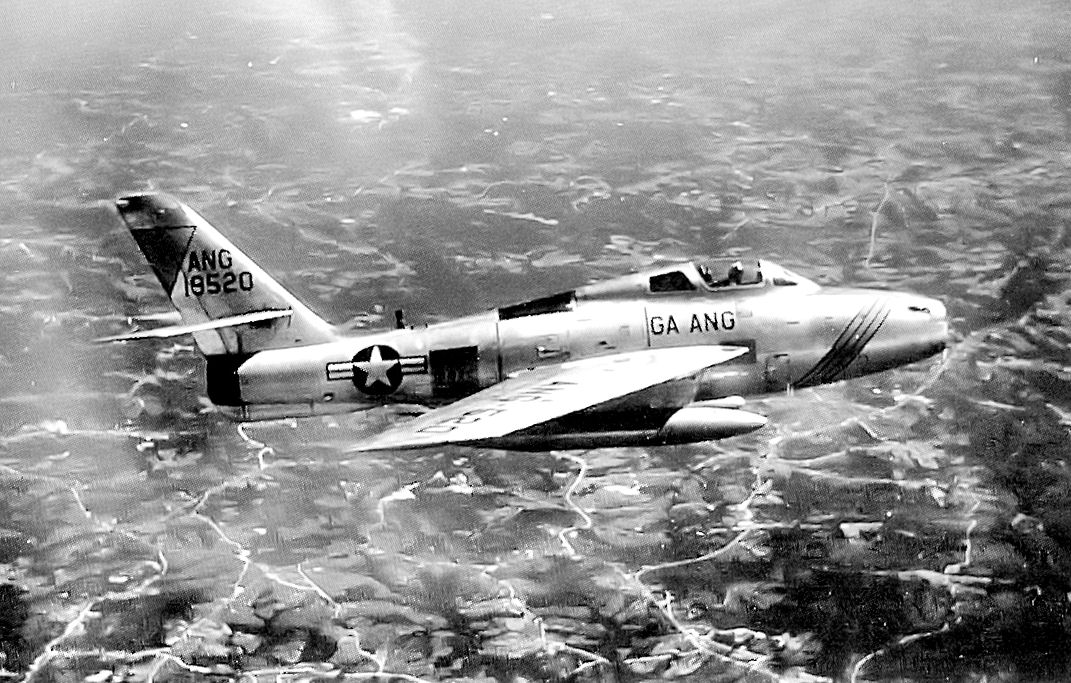
128th Fighter-Interceptor Squadron F-84F Thunderstreak (Note: Aircraft is General Motors built Republic F-84F-40-GK Thunderstreak, serial 51-9520. This aircraft was transferred to the Illinois Air National Guard and on 6 June 1959 was involved in a fatal crash at Peoria Air National Guard Base. Baugher, Joe (19 July 2023). "1951 USAF Serial Numbers". Joe Baugher. Archived from the original on 23 July 2011.)

The 116th Fighter-Bomber Group designation was returned to the Georgia Air National Guard on 10 July at Dobbins AFB. At this time the Group was restructured to include the 128th and 158th Fighter Squadrons. Initially upon their return to State Control both squadrons were equipped with the long-range F-51H Mustang and given an air defense mission. The 116th was assigned to Air Defense Command (ADC), being assigned to the 35th Air Division with a mission of the air defense of the Southeastern United States.

Commencing in February 1953 the 128th began conversion to F-84D Thunderjets, yet most were not received until mid summer. During the summer of 1955 the 128th was re-designated as the 128th Fighter Interceptor Squadron and converted the swept-wing Republic F-84F Thunderstreak. Strangely enough, it was not until March 1957 that the surviving D models were dispatched for salvage, with eleven of those aged D models having been lost in accidents while serving with the 128th FBS.

In 1958, the 116th implemented the ADC Runway Alert Program, in which interceptors of the 128th Fighter-Interceptor Squadron were committed to a five-minute runway alert. In 1960 the F-84s were again replaced by the North American F-86L Sabre, a day/night/all-weather aircraft designed to be integrated into the ADC SAGE interceptor direction and control system.

==== Air Transport ====
In 1961, the 116th FIG was reassigned to Military Air Transport Service (MATS), trading in its Sabre interceptors for 4-engines Boeing C-97 Stratofreighter transports. With air transportation recognized as a critical wartime need, the squadron was redesignated the 128th Air Transport Squadron, Heavy. The 116th was assigned to the MATS Eastern Transport Air Force, (EASTAF), and the squadron flew long-distance transport missions in support of Air Force requirements, frequently sending aircraft to the Caribbean, Europe Greenland, and the Middle East in support of Air Force requirements.

In 1966 MATS became the Military Airlift Command (MAC) and EASTAF became the MAC Twenty-First Air Force. The 116th was upgraded to the Douglas C-124 Globemaster II strategic heavy airlifter, being the first Air National Guard unit to receive the aircraft. Due to requirements generated by the Vietnam War, missions were flown across the Pacific to Hawaii, Japan, the Philippines, South Vietnam, Okinawa and Thailand.

==== Post-Vietnam ====
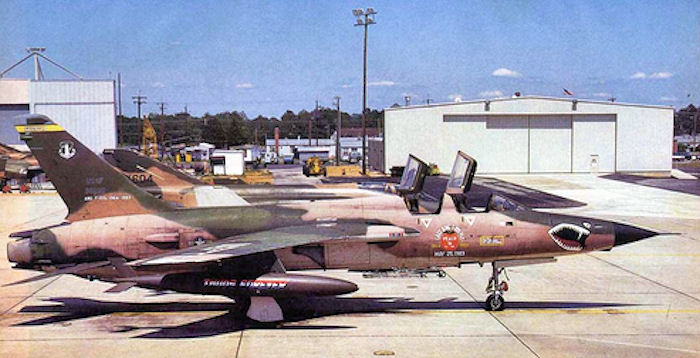
the last F-105 in USAF service at Dobbins AFB (Note: Aircraft is Republic F-105F-1-RE Thunderchief, serial 63-8299 on 25 May 1983. It was the last F-105 in USAF service. This plane was sent to the Aberdeen Proving Grounds to be used as a target. Baugher, Joe (25 July 2023). "1963 USAF Serial Numbers". Joe Baugher.)

In the years after the Vietnam War, the transport requirements of MAC along with the retirement of the C-124 led the 116th to be reassigned back to Tactical Air Command in 1974 and was re-equipped with North American F-100 Super Sabre tactical fighter-bombers, many aircraft being veterans of the Vietnam War. The 116th was changed in status from a Group to a Wing with the reassignment to TAC, and the 128th flew the Super Saber jets for six accident-free years until May 1979 when the last aircraft left Dobbins AFB to be retired as part of the phaseout of the F-100 from the inventory. The F-100s were replaced with other Vietnam-era hand-me-down combat veteran aircraft by TAC during the early 1980s, as F-105G Thunderchief Wild Weasel electronic warfare aircraft were assigned, then retired and McDonnell F-4D Phantom II fighter bombers in their final years of service.

In 1986 the 116th retired the last of its Vietnam War Phantoms and received McDonnell Douglas F-15A Eagle air superiority fighters. The F-15A was introduced into the inventory in the mid-1970s and now were being upgraded in the active duty by the improved F-15C. The 128th flew the F-15 for the next ten years. The 116th Tactical Fighter Wing developed an impressive record of accomplishment and was awarded nine Air Force Outstanding Unit Awards.

==== B-1B Lancer ====
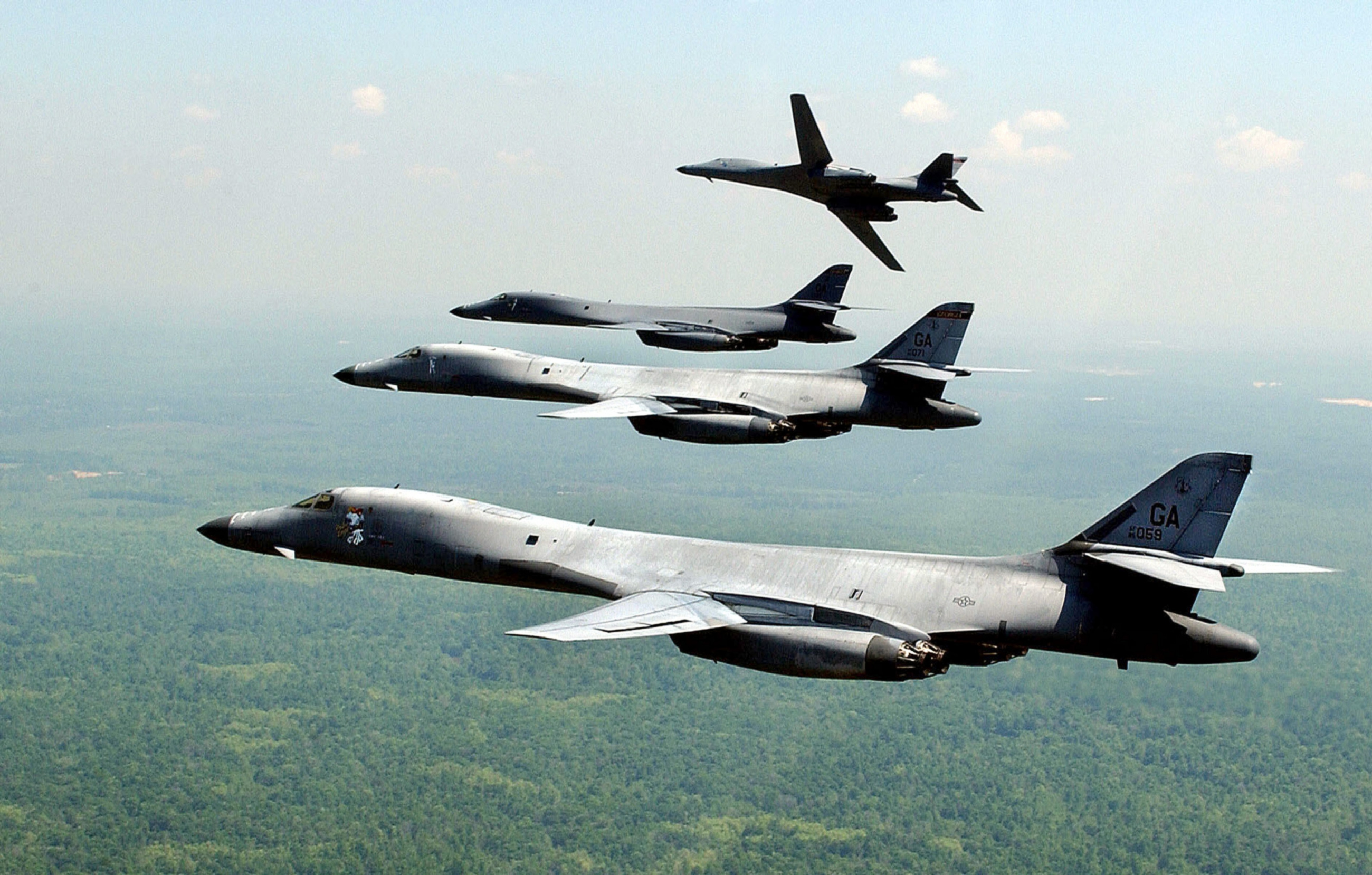
Four U.S. Air Force Rockwell B-1B Lancer from the 128th Bomb Squadron, 19 April 2002

In 1992 as part of the post Cold-War reorganizations of the Air Force, the 116th converted to the Air Force Objective organization and the 128th was assigned to the new 116th Operations Group. In 1992 Tactical Air Command was inactivated and the 116th was assigned to the new Air Combat Command (ACC).

After calling Dobbins AFB home for 50 years, the 116th was presented with a new challenge in 1996. The wing simultaneously converted from the F-15 Eagle fighters to the Rockwell B-1B Lancer strategic bomber and moved 110 miles south to Robins Air Force Base east of Warner Robins, Georgia. As part of the post Cold-War drawdown, the active-duty fleet of B-1Bs were being reduced for budget reductions and being taken off Alert Status by the former Strategic Air Command (SAC), which itself was inactivated in 1992.

Having to make the most of the available facilities, including the former Strategic Air Command alert facility at Robins, the 116th Bomb Wing was quickly up and running and participated in a number of deployments and exercises around the world in the B-1B.

==== Airborne Command and Control ====
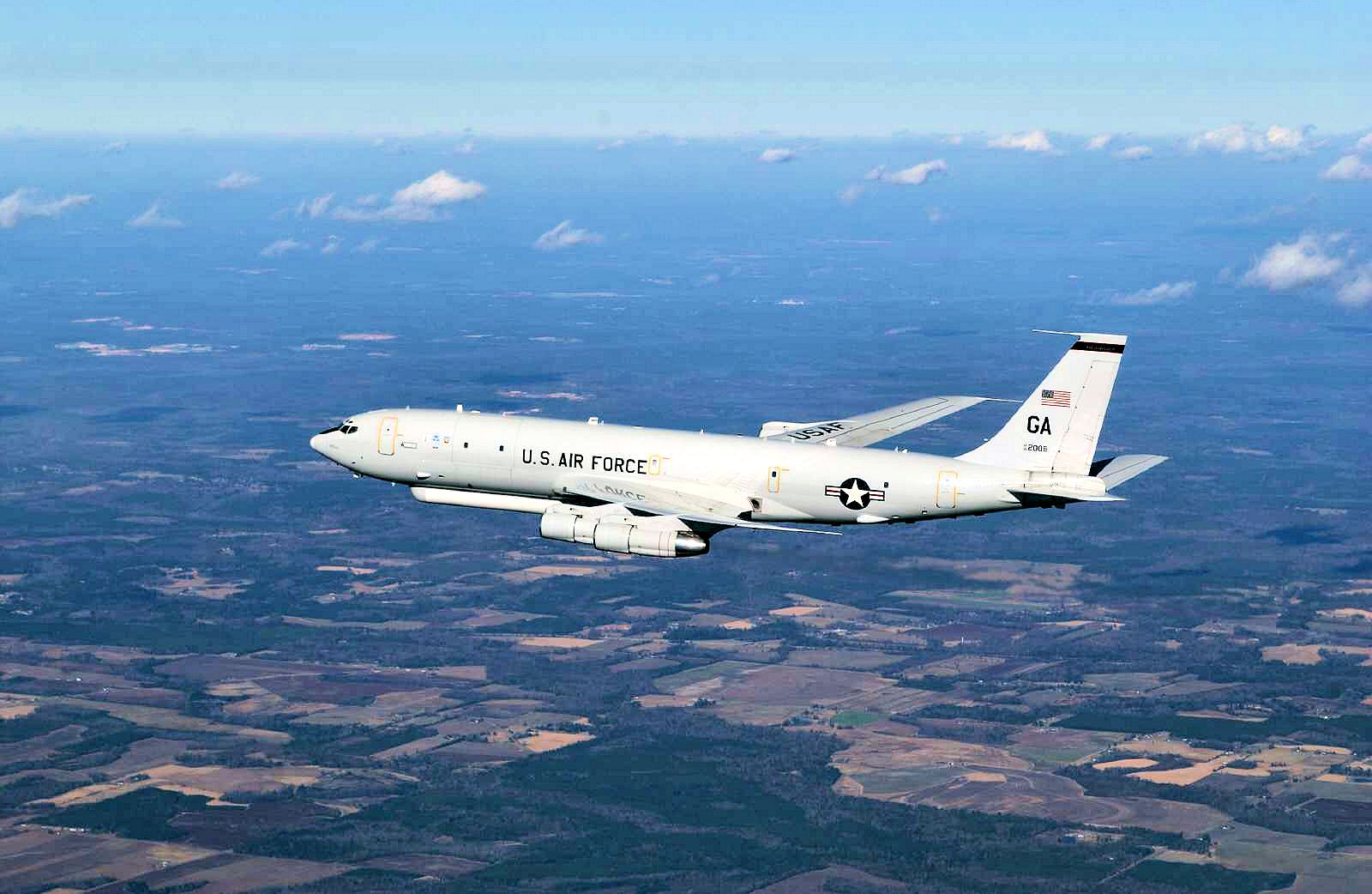
116th Wing E-8C Joint STARS (Note: Aircraft is Northrop Grumman E-8C JSTARS, serial 01-2005. This plane was formerly Boeing C-18A, serial 81-0892, later converted to EC-18B range instrumentation aircraft. Baugher, Joe (7 May 2023). "2001 USAF Serial Numbers". Joe Baugher.Baugher, Joe (10 June 2023). "1981 USAF Serial Numbers". Joe Baugher.)

In order to save money, in 2002 the USAF agreed to reduce its fleet of B-1Bs from 92 to 60 aircraft. The 116th Bomb Wing, having older aircraft was ordered to send its aircraft to "active storage" which meant that they could be quickly returned to service should circumstances dictate. Its first B-1B was flown to AMARC storage at Davis-Monthan AFB, Arizona on 20 August.

Under the Air Force's Total Force Initiative as a "blended" wing. America's first "Total Force" wing, the former 93d Air Control Wing, an active-duty Air Combat Command unit, and the 116th Bomb Wing, a Georgia Air National Guard unit, were inactivated effective 1 October 2002.

The 116th was immediately reactivated and redesignated as the 116th Air Control Wing. The 116th was a blend of active-duty and national guard Airmen into a single unit. The 116th ACW was equipped with the new E-8C Joint STARS airborne battle management aircraft. Its mission is command and control, intelligence, surveillance and reconnaissance. Its primary mission is to provide theater ground and air commanders with ground surveillance to support attack operations and targeting that contributes to the delay, disruption and destruction of enemy forces. The E-8C evolved from Army and Air Force programs to develop, detect, locate and attack enemy armor at ranges beyond the forward area of troops.

The 128th Airborne Command and Control Squadron has flown more than 82,000 combat hours in support of Operation Enduring Freedom, Operation Iraqi Freedom, Operation New Dawn, Operation Odyssey Dawn, and Operation Unified Protector. Beginning in 2011, its operational resume expanded to include support of five Combatant Commands including U.S. Pacific Command, U.S. Northern Command and U.S. Southern Command.

On 1 October 2011 the 128th Airborne Command and Control Squadron was inactivated as a Joint Air National Guard/United States Air Force Unit. The 116th ACW was returned to the sole jurisdiction of the Georgia Air National Guard on 1 October 2011 and reactivated.

== Lineage ==
840th Bombardment Squadron

- Organized as the 840th Aero Squadron (Repair) on 1 February 1918

Demobilized in March 1919
Reconstituted and consolidated with the 840th Bombardment Squadron as the 840th Bombardment Squadron in 1944

128th Airborne Command and Control Squadron

- Constituted as the 128th Observation Squadron and allotted to Georgia National Guard on 30 July 1940

Activated on 1 May 1941
Ordered into active service on 15 September 1941
Redesignated 128th Observation Squadron (Light) on 13 January 1942
Redesignated 128th Observation Squadron on 4 July 1942
Redesignated 21st Antisubmarine Squadron (Medium) on 3 March 1943
Redesignated 21st Antisubmarine Squadron (Heavy) on 20 April 1943
Redesignated 818th Bombardment Squadron (Heavy) on 28 September 1943
Redesignated 840th Bombardment Squadron, Heavy on 15 February 1944 (Note: This squadron is not related to the 840th Bombardment Squadron (Heavy) that was constituted on 14 September 1943, activated on 1 October 1943 and assigned to the 488th Bombardment Group at Geiger Field, Washington; moved to MacDill Field c. 1 November 1943; was redesignated the 818th Bombardment Squadron (Heavy) on 15 February 1944 and disbanded on 1 May 1944.)
Consolidated with the 840th Aero Squadron in 1944

- Inactivated on 25 September 1945
- Redesignated 128th Fighter Squadron, and allotted to the National Guard on 24 May 1946

Extended federal recognition on 20 August 1946
Federalized and placed on active duty on 10 October 1950
Inactivated on 10 July 1952
Redesignated 128th Fighter-Interceptor Squadron, returned to Georgia state control and activated on 10 July 1952
Redesignated 128th Fighter-Bomber Squadron on 1 December 1952
Redesignated 128th Fighter-Interceptor Squadron on 1 July 1955
Redesignated 128th Air Transport Squadron, Heavy on 1 April 1961
Redesignated 128th Military Airlift Squadron on 8 January 1966
Redesignated 128th Tactical Fighter Squadron on 4 April 1973
Redesignated 128th Fighter Squadron on 15 March 1992
Redesignated 128th Bomb Squadron on 1 April 1996
Inactivated on 1 October 2002

- Activated as 128th Airborne Command and Control Squadron on 1 October 2002

Inactivated 1 October 2011

- Activated on 1 October 2011

=== Assignments ===
- Post Headquarters, Rich Field, 1 February-4 March 1918
- Aviation Concentration Center, 4 Mar-15 April 1918;
- Chief of Air Service, AEF, 4 May-13 August 1918

Attached to: Royal Flying Corps for training
Attached to: Number 3 Aircraft Depot, Independent Forces, RAF, 20 August 1918

- 2d Air Depot, AEF, 20 November 1918 – 29 January 1919
- Post Headquarters, Langley Field, 4 Mar–March 1919
- Georgia National Guard, 1 May 1941
- II Air Support Command, 15 September 1941
- 71st Observation Group, 1 October 1941
- Third Air Force, 26 February 1942
- 77th Observation Group, 12 March 1942 (attached to Gulf Task Force, 3 July-7 September 1942, AAF Antisubmarine Command, 15 October 1942 – 3 March 1943)
- AAF Antisubmarine Command, 8 March 1943
- 483d Bombardment Group, 28 Sep 1943 – 25 Sep 1945
- 54th Fighter Wing, 20 August 1946
- 116th Fighter Group (later 116th Fighter-Bomber Group), 9 September 1946
- 137th Fighter-Bomber Group, Nov 1950
- 116th Fighter-Interceptor Group (later 116th Fighter-Bomber Group, 116th Fighter-Interceptor Group, 116th Air Transport Group, 116th Military Airlift Group, 116th Tactical Fighter Group), 10 July 1952
- 116th Tactical Fighter Wing, 10 December 1974
- 116th Operations Group, 15 March 1992 – 1 October 2002; 1 October 2002 – 1 October 2011;1 October 2011 – present

=== Stations ===
- Rich Field, Waco, Texas, 1 February 1918;
- Aviation Concentration Center, Garden City, New York, 4 Mar-15 April 1918;
- RFC Yatesbury, Wiltshire, 4 May-13 August 1918;
- Courban Aerodrome, France, 20 August 1918
- Latrecey Aerodrome, France, 20 November 1918
- Brest, France, 1–11 February 1919
- Langley Field, Virginia, 4 Mar–March 1919
- Atlanta Municipal Airport, Georgia, 1 May 1941
- Lawson Field, Georgia, 23 September 1941
- Key Field, Mississippi, 13 April 1942
- New Orleans Army Air Base, Louisiana, 20 June 1942
- Gulfport Army Air Field, Mississippi, 2 May 1943
- Ephrata Army Air Base, Washington, 28 September 1943
- MacDill Field, Florida, 7 November 1943 – 2 March 1944
- Sterparone Airfield, Italy, 9 April 1944
- Pisa Airfield, Italy, 15 May-25 September 1945
- Marietta Army Air Field (later Dobbins Air Force Base, Dobbins Air Reserve Base), Georgia, 9 September 1946
- Robins Air Force Base, Georgia, 1 April 1996 – 1 October 2002
- Robins Air Force Base, Georgia, 1 October 2002 – 1 October 2011
- Robins Air Force Base, Georgia, 1 October 2011 – present

=== Aircraft ===
- Curtiss A-18 Shrike, 1941–1942
- Piper L-4 Grasshopper, 1941–1942
- Douglas O-38, 1941–1942
- Douglas O-43, 1941–1942
- Douglas O-46, 1941–1942
- Stinson O-49 Vigilant, 1941–1942
- North American O-47, 1942–1943
- North American B-25 Mitchell, 1943
- Boeing B-17 Flying Fortress, 1943–1945
- Republic F-47N Thunderbolt, 1946–1950
- Republic F-84G Thunderjet, 1950–1952
- North American F-51H Mustang, 1952
- Republic F-84D Thunderjet, 1952–1955
- Republic F-84F Thunderstreak, 1955–1960
- North American F-86L Sabre, 1960–1961
- Boeing C-97F Stratofreighter, 1961–1965
- Douglas C-124C Globemaster II, 1965–1973
- North American F-100D Super Sabre, 1973–1979
- Republic F-105G Thunderchief, 1979–1983
- McDonnell F-4D Phantom II, 1982–1987
- McDonnell Douglas F-15A Eagle, 1986–1996
- Rockwell B-1B Lancer, 1996–2002
- E-8C Joint STARS, 2002–present.

== See also ==
- Boeing B-17 Flying Fortress Units of the Mediterranean Theater of Operations
- List of American aero squadrons
- List of observation squadrons of the United States Army National Guard
