= Sterparone Airfield =

Sterparone Airfield
- Part of Fifteenth Air Force
- Province of Foggia, Italy
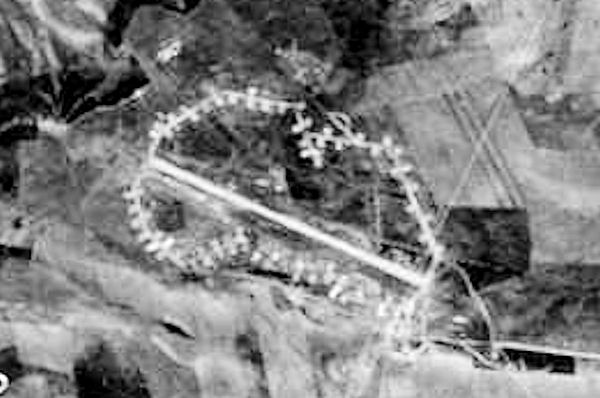
- Sterparone Airfield, Italy, 1945

Site information
- Type: Military airfield
- Controlled by: United States Army Air Forces

Location
- Location of Sterparone Airfield, Italy
- Coordinates: 41°36′06.28″N 015°18′24″E

Site history
- Built: 1943
- In use: 1943-1945
- Battles/wars: World War II

Sterparone Airfield is an abandoned World War II military airfield in Italy. It was located 11.1 kilometers south-southeast of San Severo, in the Province of Foggia. The airfield was abandoned and dismantled after the end of the war in 1945.

== History ==
Sterparone airfield was a temporary wartime facility built by the US Army Corps of Engineers. Construction was initiated in September 1943, after Allied forces seized control of the Tavoliere plain around Foggia, Apulia, Italy. The only known use of the airfield was by the Fifteenth Air Force 483d Bombardment Group, which arrived from Tortorella Airfield, Italy on 22 April 1944.

The 483d Bomb Group consisted of four B-17 Flying Fortress squadrons:

- 815th Bombardment Squadron
- 816th Bombardment Squadron
- 817th Bombardment Squadron
- 840th Bombardment Squadron

The airfield had a single, 6,000' x 100' asphalt runway, oriented 10/28 with two perimeter tracks, each containing about 50 aircraft parking hardstands. There may have been some temporary hangars and buildings; however, it appears that personnel were quartered primarily in tents, and most aircraft maintenance took place in the open on hardstands. It also had a steel control tower.

The 483d departed after the end of the war, moving to Pisa Airport for service with Air Transport Command on 15 May 1945. Sometime after that departure, the engineers moved in and dismantled the facility.

Today Sterparone Airfield has been returned to agriculture; however, extensive scarring of the landscape remains, showing various dispersal pads and taxiways and other features.

== See also ==
- Boeing B-17 Flying Fortress airfields in the Mediterranean Theater of Operations
