= 816th Expeditionary Airlift Squadron =

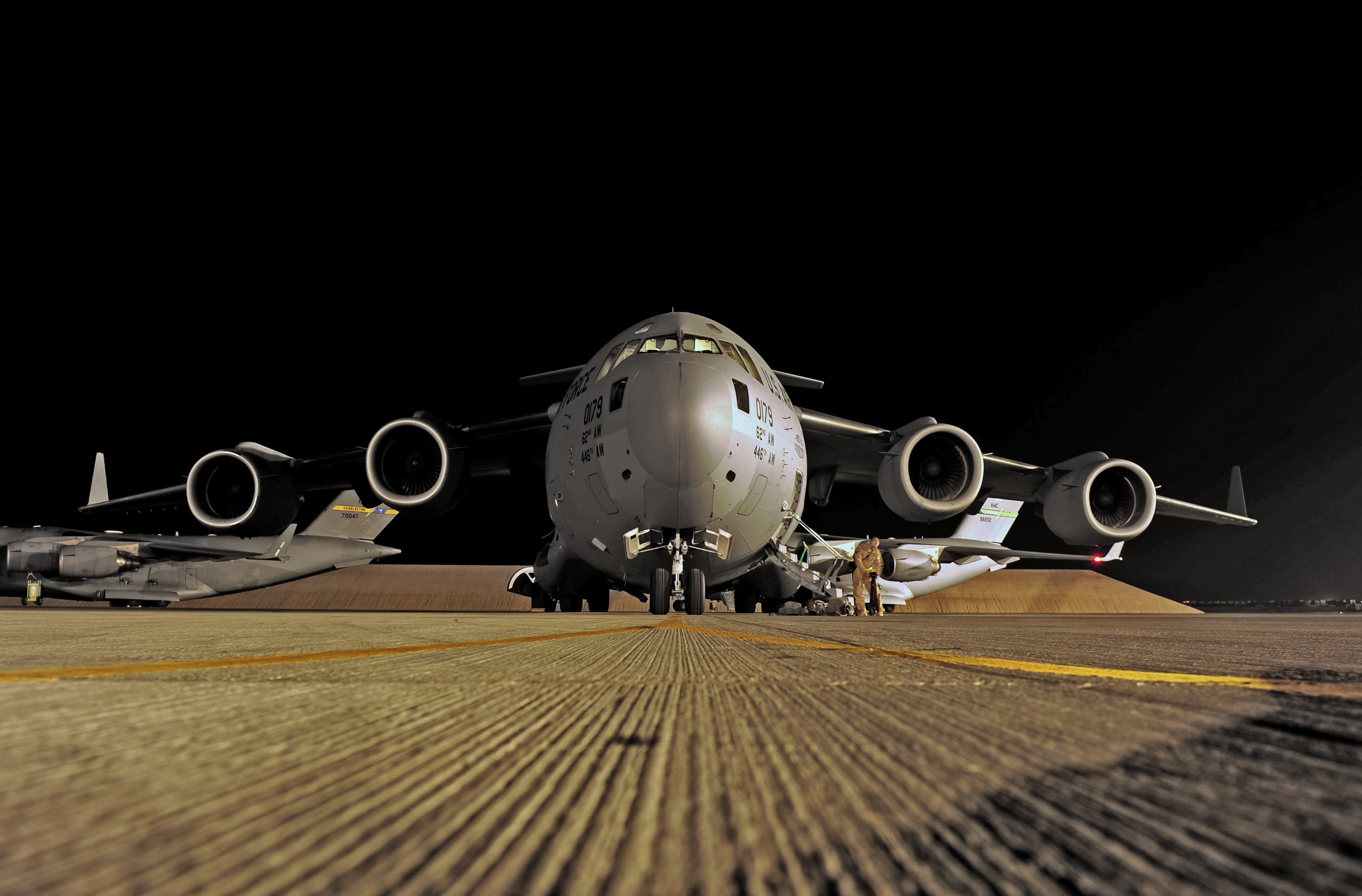
- Squadron C-17 Globemaster III on the flight line (Note: Photo taken during pre-flight checks prior to the transport of an M1A1 Abrams tank to Afghanistan in support of Operation Enduring Freedom on 28 November 2010.)
- Active: 1942–1945; 1953–1956; 2006–2022
- Country: United States
- Branch: United States Air Force
- Role: Airlift
- Part of: Air Mobility Command
- Engagements: Mediterranean Theater of Operations; Korean War; Afghanistan Campaign; Iraq Campaign
- Decorations: Distinguished Unit Citation; Air Force Outstanding Unit Award; Republic of Korea Presidential Unit Citation

Insignia
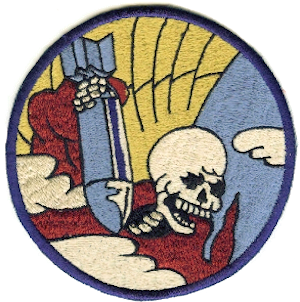
- 816th Expeditionary Airlift Squadron emblem (Note: Approved 22 March 1944. Description: On a light turquoise blue disc, border medium blue, a skeleton proper, in flight, winged light yellow orange, wearing a light red violet robe, and hurling a light turquoise blue aerial bomb, shaded medium blue, highlighted white, point toward center base, with upraised right hand, all behind small white cloud formations, outlined medium blue.)

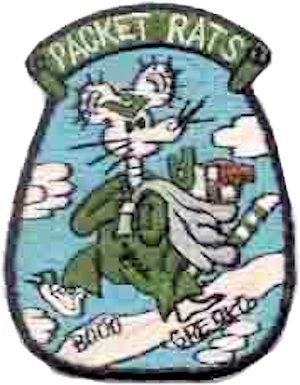
- Unofficial 816th Troop Carrier Squadron patch (Korean War era) (Note: The "Packet" refers to the official name of the C-119, which was more commonly referred to as the "Flying Boxcar." The emblem was not officially approved. See Maurer, Combat Squadrons, pp. 766–767 (World War II emblem still the official unit emblem in 1963.))

The 816th Expeditionary Airlift Squadron was a provisional United States Air Force unit. It is assigned to the 385th Air Expeditionary Group, stationed at Al Udeid Air Base, Doha, Qatar. It was last engaged in combat operations in Southwest Asia.

During World War II as the 816th Bombardment Squadron, it was one of the last B-17 Flying Fortress heavy bomber squadrons deployed to Southern Italy as part of the Fifteenth Air Force's 483d Bombardment Group in March 1944. The squadron earned two Distinguished Unit Citations in combat over Germany. After the war, it helped transport American soldiers returning to the United States until it was inactivated in Italy.

The squadron was activated as the 816th Troop Carrier Squadron in 1953 in Japan, when it replaced a reserve unit that had been activated for the Korean War. It airlifted troops and materiel in the Pacific until inactivating in 1956.

== Mission ==
The 816th was equipped with Boeing C-17 Globemaster III transported and supported Coalition forces engaging in combat operations as part of Operation Enduring Freedom and Operation Iraqi Freedom, and also operated in the Horn of Africa. The mission of the 816th was to provide global strategic airlift, airdrop, aeromedical evacuation and humanitarian relief, to create an air bridge for personnel, equipment and supplies throughout their assigned areas of responsibility.

== History ==
=== World War II ===
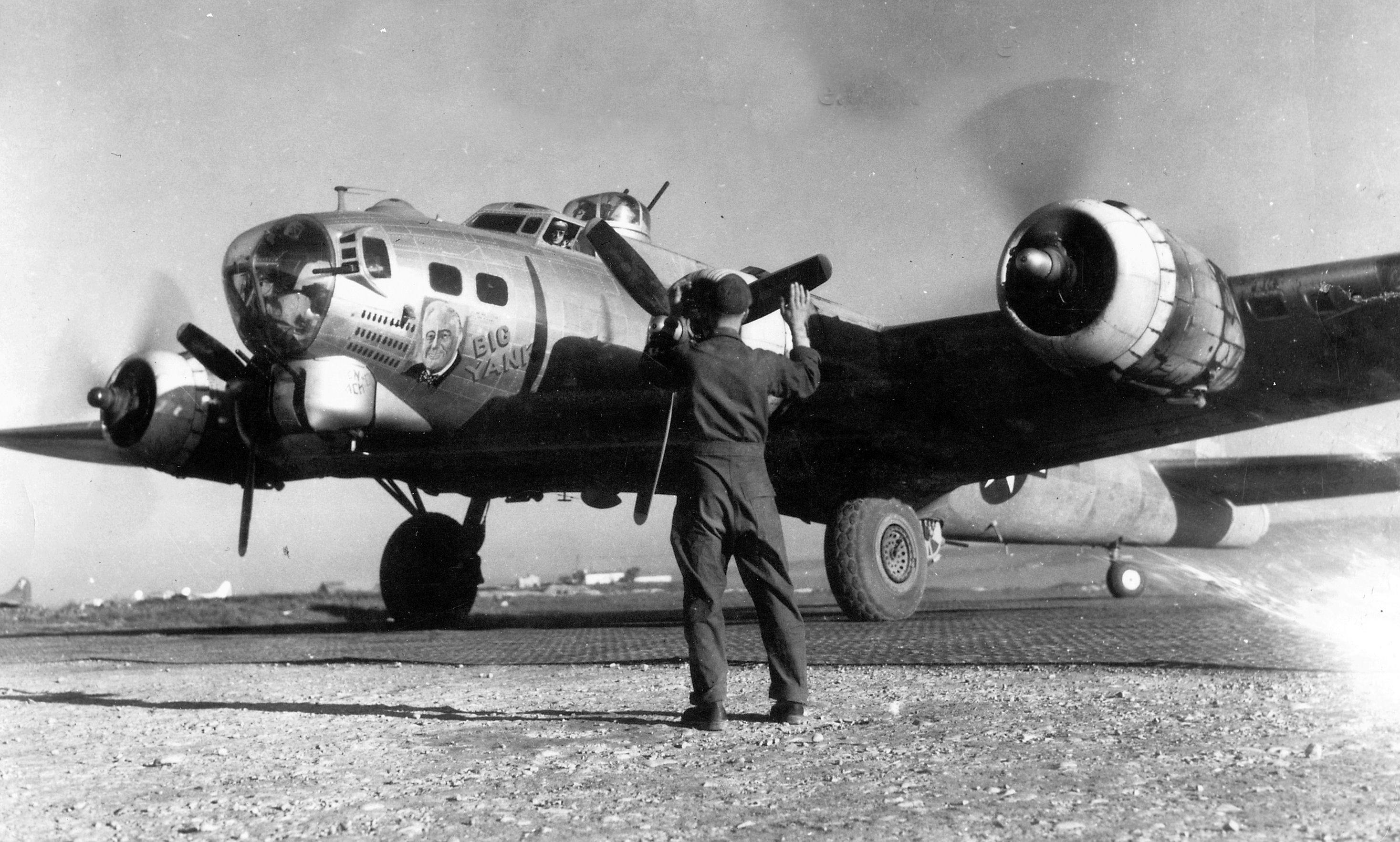
483d Bomb Group B-17G Flying Fortress (Note: Aircraft is Douglas Aircraft built Boeing B-17G-50-DL Flying Fortress, serial 44-6405, Big Yank. On 24 March 1945, gunners on this plane were credited with destroying three Messerschmitt Me 262 jet fighters and damaging another. In May 1945, it was stripped of all turrets and armament and converted as a troop transport for participation in the Green Project. After the war it was stored at Walnut Ridge Army Air Field and sold for scrap in September 1946. Baugher, Joe (23 June 2023). "1944 USAF Serial Numbers". Joe Baugher.)

The squadron was activated at Ephrata Army Air Base as the 816th Bombardment Squadron (Heavy) on 20 September 1943 as one of the four original squadrons of the 483d Bombardment Group. In November, the squadron moved to MacDill Field, Florida, where it trained with Boeing B-17 Flying Fortresses under Third Air Force.

The 816th deployed to the Mediterranean Theater of Operations, where it became part of Fifteenth Air Force at Sterparone Airfield in Southern Italy. The squadron's air element flew its Flying Fortresses to Sterparone via Tortorella Airfield, while the ground element moved to Sterparone via troop ship. It began operations in April 1944 with an attack on a cement factory in Split, Yugoslavia.

The squadron engaged in long-range strategic bombardment of enemy military, industrial and transport targets, including factories, oil refineries, marshalling yards, airfields, and troop concentrations in Italy, France. Southern Germany, Austria, Czechoslovakia, and the Balkans. In June 1944, the squadron participated in a shuttle mission, departing Italy and landing in the Soviet Union, attacking targets en route and on the return flight. This enabled attacks on targets too far from the squadron's base to strike and return home. The squadron received a Distinguished Unit Citation for combat action two months later. On 18 July 1944 the squadron, along with the other elements of the 483d Group, bombed the objective, an airfield and installations at Memmingen, engaging numerous enemy aircraft in the target area despite a lack of cover from its planned fighter escort. It received a second citation for braving fighter assaults and flak to bomb tank factories at Berlin on 24 March 1945.

The squadron was occasionally diverted from the strategic attack on Germany. It struck targets in southern France in preparation for Operation Dragoon, the invasion of August 1944. The group also supported ground forces in northern Italy during the Allied offensive in April 1945.

After V-E Day, the unit moved to Pisa Airfield, where it operated under the control of Air Transport Command's Green Project which was the movement of troops back to the United States. The squadron carried troops from Pisa to a staging area in Morocco. Its B-17s were disarmed with flooring and seats for 25 passengers installed. It carried passengers from Pisa to Port Lyautey Airfield, French Morocco for further movement them across the Atlantic. The squadron was inactivated in Italy in September 1945.

=== Airlift in the Pacific Area ===
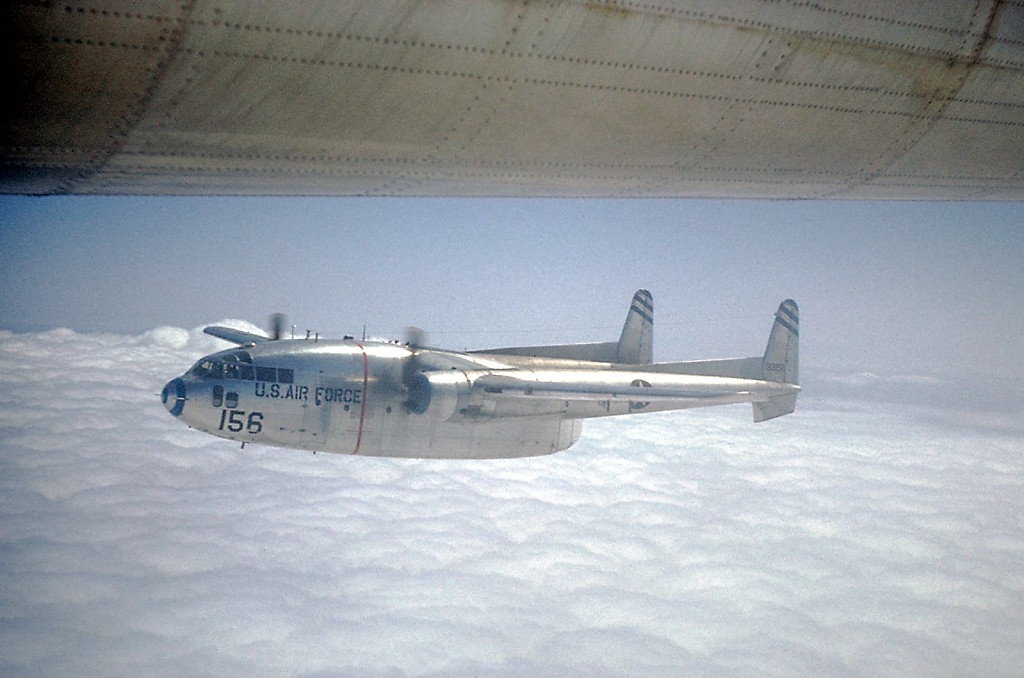
483d Group C-119G Flying Boxcar (Note: Aircraft is Fairchild C-119G-FA Packet, serial 53-3156. This airplane was converted to AC-119K Stinger. It was destroyed on 19 February 1970 when it landed short of the runway at Da Nang Air Base due to fuel starvation. The crew escaped with minor injuries. Baugher, Joe (15 July 2023). "1953 USAF Serial Numbers". Joe Baugher.)

The Air Force was returning the 403d Troop Carrier Wing, which was stationed at Ashiya Air Base during the Korean War, to reserve status at the beginning of 1953. The 403d Wing had been mobilized in April 1951 and had moved to Japan a year later. In its place, the Air Force activated the 483d Troop Carrier Wing. The 816th was activated as the 816th Troop Carrier Squadron and absorbed the mission, personnel and Fairchild C-119 Flying Boxcars of the 64th Troop Carrier Squadron, which was simultaneously inactivated.

In June 1953, the squadron, along with the other squadrons of the 483d Wing, airlifted the 187th Regimental Combat Team from Japan to Korea, to prevent a breakthrough by North Korean and Chinese Communist forces before an armistice agreement could be signed. It performed troop carrier and air transport operations in the Far East, including landing of troops and cargo in forward areas of the combat zone, air transportation of airborne troops and equipment, and air evacuation of casualties, receiving a Korean Presidential Unit Citation for these actions. For its actions in transporting United Nations troops in Korea and training with airborne units, the squadron was one of the first units to earn an Air Force Outstanding Unit Award. Between April 1953 and September 1954, the squadron aided the French Air Force in Indochina by training personnel and hauling supplies. On 17 September 1956, the squadron moved to Tachikawa Air Base, Japan, where it was inactivated the following day and its aircraft and crews transferred to the 374th Troop Carrier Group at Tachikawa.

=== Expeditionary operations ===
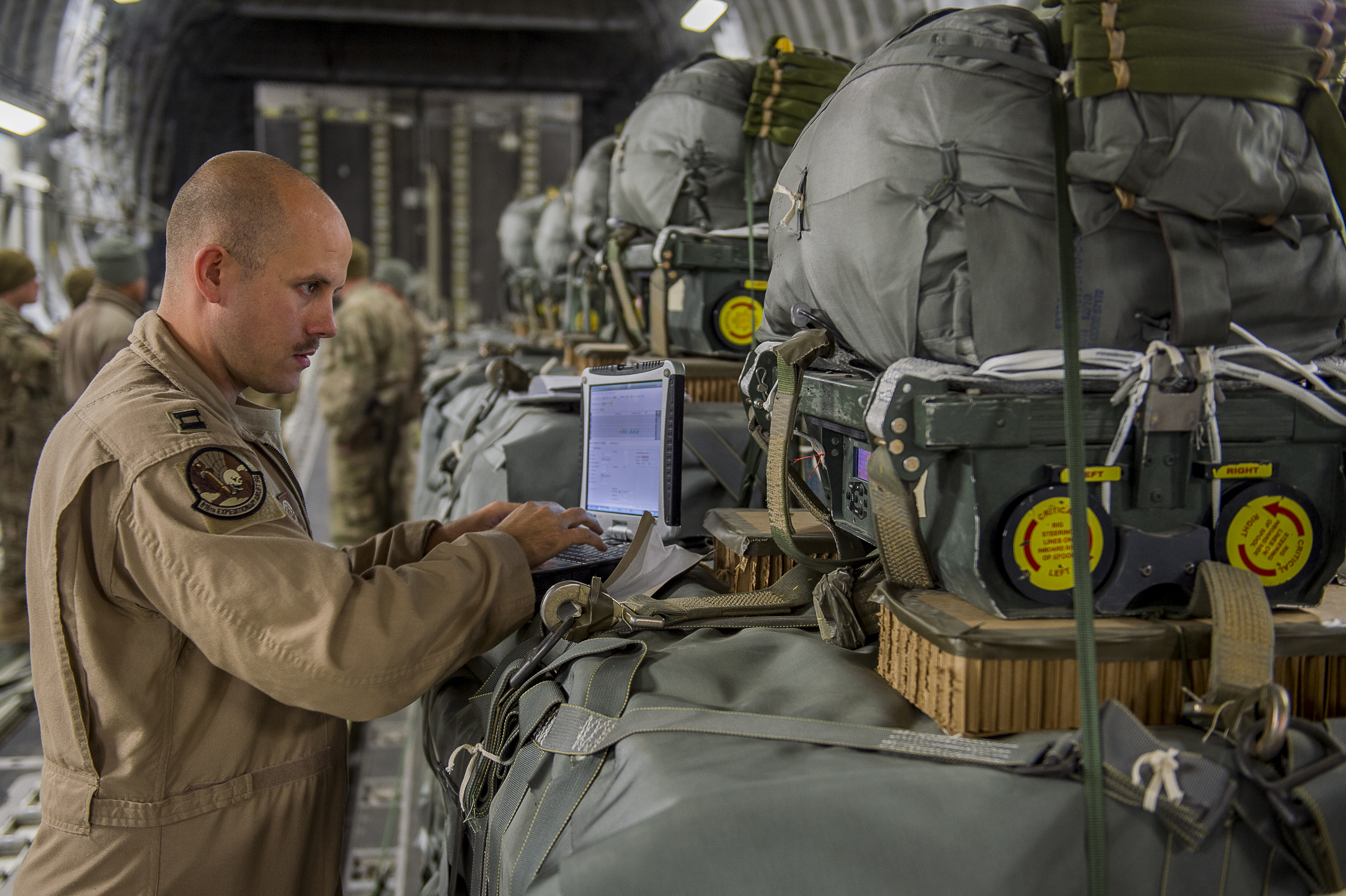
A pilot from the 816th programs a Joint Precision Airdrop System bundle for precision airdrop from one of their C-17s

Reactivated in 2006 as a Boeing C-17 Globemaster III squadron after the United States invasion of Afghanistan. Provided intra-theater transport within Southwest Asia and other locations as directed in support of units engaged in combat operations. During a recent deployment of personnel. the aircrews flew about 3,000 sorties in the C-17 Globemaster III, logged more than 8,000 flying hours and airlifted more than 148 million pounds of cargo and more than 37,000 airmen, soldiers, sailors, marines and distinguished visitors throughout Southwest Asia.

== Lineage ==
- Constituted as the 816th Bombardment Squadron (Heavy) on 14 September 1943

Activated on 20 September 1943
Redesignated 816th Bombardment Squadron, Heavy c. September 1944
Inactivated on 25 September 1945

- Redesignated 816th Troop Carrier Squadron, Medium on 15 November 1952

. Activated on 1 January 1953

Inactivated on 18 September 1956

- Redesignated 816th Expeditionary Airlift Squadron and converted to provisional status on 12 June 2002

Activated on 1 October 2006

=== Assignments ===
- 483d Bombardment Group, 20 September 1943 – 25 September 1945
- 483d Troop Carrier Group, 1 January 1953 – 18 September 1956
- Air Mobility Command to activate or inactivate at any time after 12 June 2002

385th Air Expeditionary Group, 1 October 2006
379th Expeditionary Operations Group, unknown–present

=== Stations ===
- Ephrata Army Air Base, Washington, 20 September 1943
- MacDill Field, Florida, 7 November 1943 – 2 March 1944
- Sterparone Airfield, Italy, 9 April 1944
- Pisa Airfield, Italy, 15 May-25 September 1945
- Ashiya Air Base, Japan, 1 January 1953
- Tachikawa Air Base, Japan, 17–18 September 1956
- Al Udeid Air Base, Doha, Qatar, 1 October 2006 – present

=== Aircraft ===
- Boeing B-17 Flying Fortress, 1943–1945
- C-119 Flying Boxcar, 1953–1956
- C-17 Globemaster III, 2006–present

Award streamer	Award	Dates	Notes
	Distinguished Unit Citation	18 July 1944	Germany, 816th Bombardment Squadron
	Distinguished Unit Citation	24 March 1945	Germany, 816th Bombardment Squadron
	Air Force Outstanding Unit Award	6 May 1953-10 September 1954	816th Troop Carrier Squadron
	Republic of Korea Presidential Unit Citation	1 January 1953-28 July 1953	816th Troop Carrier Squadron

Campaign Streamer	Campaign	Dates	Notes
	Air Offensive, Europe	9 April 1944 – 5 June 1944	816th Bombardment Squadron
	Normandy	6 June 1944 – 24 July 1944	816th Bombardment Squadron
	Northern France	25 July 1944 – 14 September 1944	816th Bombardment Squadron
	Rome-Arno	22 January 1944 – 9 September 1944	816th Bombardment Squadron
	Southern France	15 August 1944 – 14 September 1944	816th Bombardment Squadron
	North Apennines	10 September 1944 – 4 April 1945	816th Bombardment Squadron
	Po Valley	3 April 1945 – 8 May 1945	816th Bombardment Squadron
	Rhineland	15 September 1944 – 21 March 1945	816th Bombardment Squadron
	Central Europe	9 April 1944 – 21 May 1945	816th Bombardment Squadron
	Air Combat, EAME Theater	9 April 1944 – 11 May 1945	816th Bombardment Squadron
	Third Korean Winter	1 January 1953 – 30 April 1953	816th Troop Carrier Squadron
	Korea Summer-Fall 1953	1 May 1953 – 27 July 1953	816th Troop Carrier Squadron

== See also ==
- Boeing B-17 Flying Fortress Units of the Mediterranean Theater of Operations
