= Duncan Town Airport =

- IATA: DCT; ICAO: MYRD

Summary
- Airport type: Public
- Serves: Ragged Island, Bahamas
- Location: Duncan Town
- Elevation AMSL: 6 ft (1.8 m)
- Coordinates: 22°10′54″N 075°43′46″W

Map
- Location in The Bahamas

Runways
Direction	Length		Surface
Direction	m	ft	Surface
13/31	1,158	3,799	Asphalt
- Source: DAFIF

Duncan Town Airport (IATA: DCT, ICAO: MYRD) is an airport located near Duncan Town, on Ragged Island in The Bahamas.

== Facilities ==
The airport resides at an elevation of 6 ft (1.8 m) above mean sea level. It has one runway designated 13/31 with an asphalt surface measuring 1,158 m × 23 m (3,799 ft × 75 ft).

== Airlines and destinations ==
Airlines	Destinations
Southern Air Charter	Nassau
