= Mizpah in Gilead (Joshua) =

Region in Gilead

The Mizpah ('watch-tower', 'look-out') is a region in Gilead, at the foot of Mount Hermon, inhabited by Hivites (Josh. 11:3, 8). The name in Hebrew here has the article before it, 'the Mizpeh', 'the watch-tower'. The modern village of Metullah, meaning also 'the look-out', probably occupies the site so called.

== See also ==
- Mizpah in Gilead (Genesis)
- Mizpah in Gilead (Judges)
