= Mitzpe Ilan =

Mitzpe Ilan: מצפה אילן (Hebrew)
- Location within Haifa region of Israel Location within Israel
- Coordinates: 32°27′40″N 35°04′09″E
- Country: Israel
- District: Haifa
- Subdistrict: Hadera
- Council: Menashe
- Affiliation: Or Movement
- Founded: 2003
- Founder: Or Movement Members
- Population (2024): 911

Mitzpe Ilan (Hebrew: מצפה אילן) is a Religious-Zionist community in the Galilee region in northern Israel. Located between Katzir and Harish, south-west of Umm al-Fahm, and close to the Green Line, it falls under the jurisdiction of Menashe Regional Council. In 2024 it had a population of 911.

== History ==
The village was established in June 2003 as a Nahal settlement and was initially named Nahal Iron. After being settled by 44 families by the Or Movement in 2005, it was renamed Mitzpe Ilan after the Israeli astronaut Ilan Ramon.
