= Mizpah in Gilead (Judges) =

Mizpah ('watch-tower', 'look-out') was a town in Gilead, where Jephthah resided, and where he assumed the command of the Israelites in a time of national danger. Here he made his rash vow; and here his daughter submitted to her mysterious fate (Book of Judges 10:17; 11:11, 34). Some scholars say it may be the same as Ramoth-Gilead (Joshua 20:8), and it is also believed by some that it is identical with the Mizpeh of Genesis 31:23, 25, 48, 49.

== See also ==
- Mizpah in Gilead (Joshua)
