= Mizpah Tertullien =

Psychologist and senator of the Bahamas

3rd female and former senator of the Bahamas

Personal details
- Born: 1930 Ragged Island
- Died: May 29, 2015 Blue Hill Estates
- Party: Progressive Liberal Party (PLP)
- Spouse: Egbert
- Children: Adopted Daughter: Alice Tertullien

Mizpah Tertullien (1930 – May 29, 2015) was a psychologist and senator of the Bahamas.

Tertullien grew up on Ragged Island and graduated from the state high school. She ran as the Progressive Liberal Party in 1972 (losing to Sir Roland Symonette. She subsequently served as a senator for ten years.

She died on 29 May 2015, receiving a state funeral at St. Francis Xavier Cathedral, West Hill. The Prime Minister Perry Christie said she "contributed significantly to the development of the modern Bahamas in a variety of spheres", praising her political activism and career in law and media.

== Works ==
- "Psychologically speaking: attitudes and cultural patterns in the Bahamas"
- "Old Stories and Riddles (Bahamiana culturama)."
