= The Green Project =

Non-Profit Organisation

- Formation: 1994
- Type: Nonprofit environmental organization
- Purpose: Recycling and reuse of building materials and paint; environmental education
- Headquarters: New Orleans, Louisiana, United States
- Region served: New Orleans, Louisiana, United States

The Green Project is a not-for-profit environmental organization established in 1994 in St. Roch, New Orleans, Louisiana. The Green Project began as a salvage operation to recover unwanted paint then expanded to used building materials in 1996. In the past, the project participated in the deconstruction of New Orleans's homes and buildings but has since focused only on donations. The project operates a retail outlet, and community workshops. Materials accepted include:

- Reusable building materials (e.g., lumber, doors, windows, bricks, tiles, lighting fixtures and sanitary ware)
- Donated latex paint is re-blended to create recycled paint; oil-based paints and primers are also accepted as part of the Second Line Recycled Paint Program

Following the massive destruction caused by Hurricane Katrina in 2005, The Green Project was involved in the salvage of building materials to be reused by the New Orleans community. The paint recycling program is the region's only paint recycling center and the only source of paint disposal for Orleans Parish. It was created to reduce the volume of paint disposed of in landfills or by pouring down drains and claims to have prevented over 100,000 gallons of paint from reaching the Mississippi River and surrounding wetlands. On average it recycles 15,000 gallons of latex paint annually.

Volunteers serve in all aspects of The Green Project, from recycling paint to conducting workshops. In 2007, The Green Project and a number of other non-profit organizations in New Orleans partnered with Tulane University Center for Public Service to better serve the needs of the New Orleans community. Through this partnership, Tulane University students volunteer at The Green Project to better learn and reflect upon issues of sustainability, social entrepreneurship, and rebuilding issues in New Orleans.

The project held a re-opening event on 13 October 2012.
