= Mizpah in Gilead (Genesis) =

Mizpah ('watch-tower', 'look-out') was a place in Gilead, so named by Laban, who overtook Jacob at this spot (Gen. 31:49) on his return to Israel from Padan-aram. Here Jacob and Laban set up their memorial cairn of stones and a pillar (Massebah) to serve to separate them: both as a boundary landmark and as a witness for their covenant and the protection of Laban's daughters Rachel and Leah.

== See also ==
- Mizpah in Gilead (Joshua)
- Mizpah in Gilead (Judges)
