= George Reynolds (general) =

U.S. Air Force general

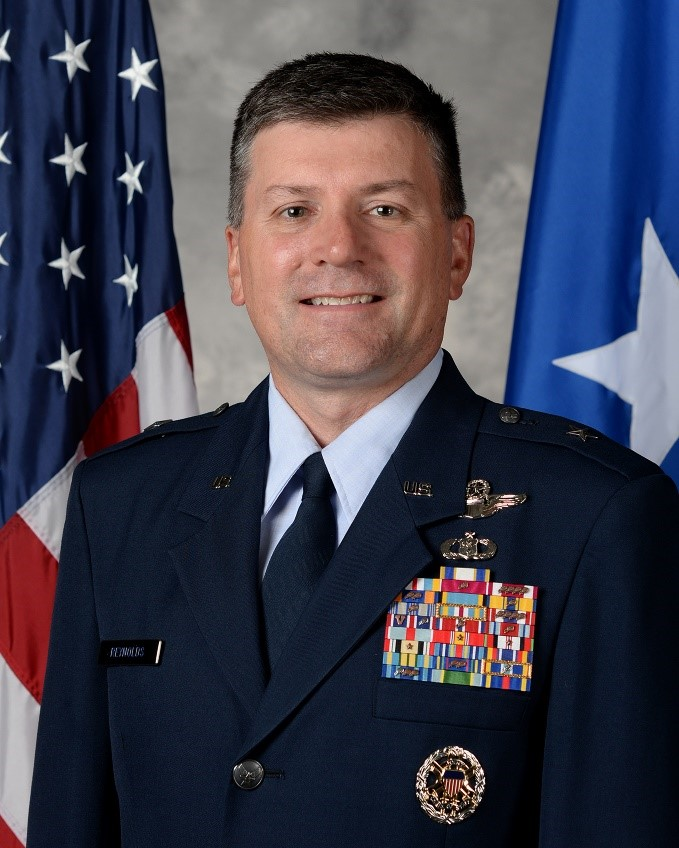
- Official portrait, 2021
- Military career
- Allegiance: United States
- Branch: United States Air Force
- Service years: 1992–present
- Rank: Brigadier General
- Commands: 55th Wing; 55th Electronic Combat Group; 42nd Electronic Combat Squadron
- Awards: Air Force Distinguished Service Medal; Defense Superior Service Medal; Legion of Merit (3)

George Martin Reynolds is a United States Air Force brigadier general who most recently served as the Vice Commander of the United States Air Force Warfare Center.

Military offices
Preceded by Gregory M. Guillot	Commander of the 55th Wing; 2015–2017	Succeeded by Michael H. Manion
Preceded by James R. Cluff	Vice Commander of the Twenty-Fifth Air Force; 2018–2019	Unit inactivated
New office	Deputy Commander and Director of Operations of the Sixteenth Air Force; 2019–2020	Succeeded by Bradley L. Pyburn
Preceded by David W. Snoddy	Vice Commander of the United States Air Force Warfare Center; 2020–2021	Succeeded by Evan L. Pettus
