= Bradley L. Pyburn =

U.S. Air Force general

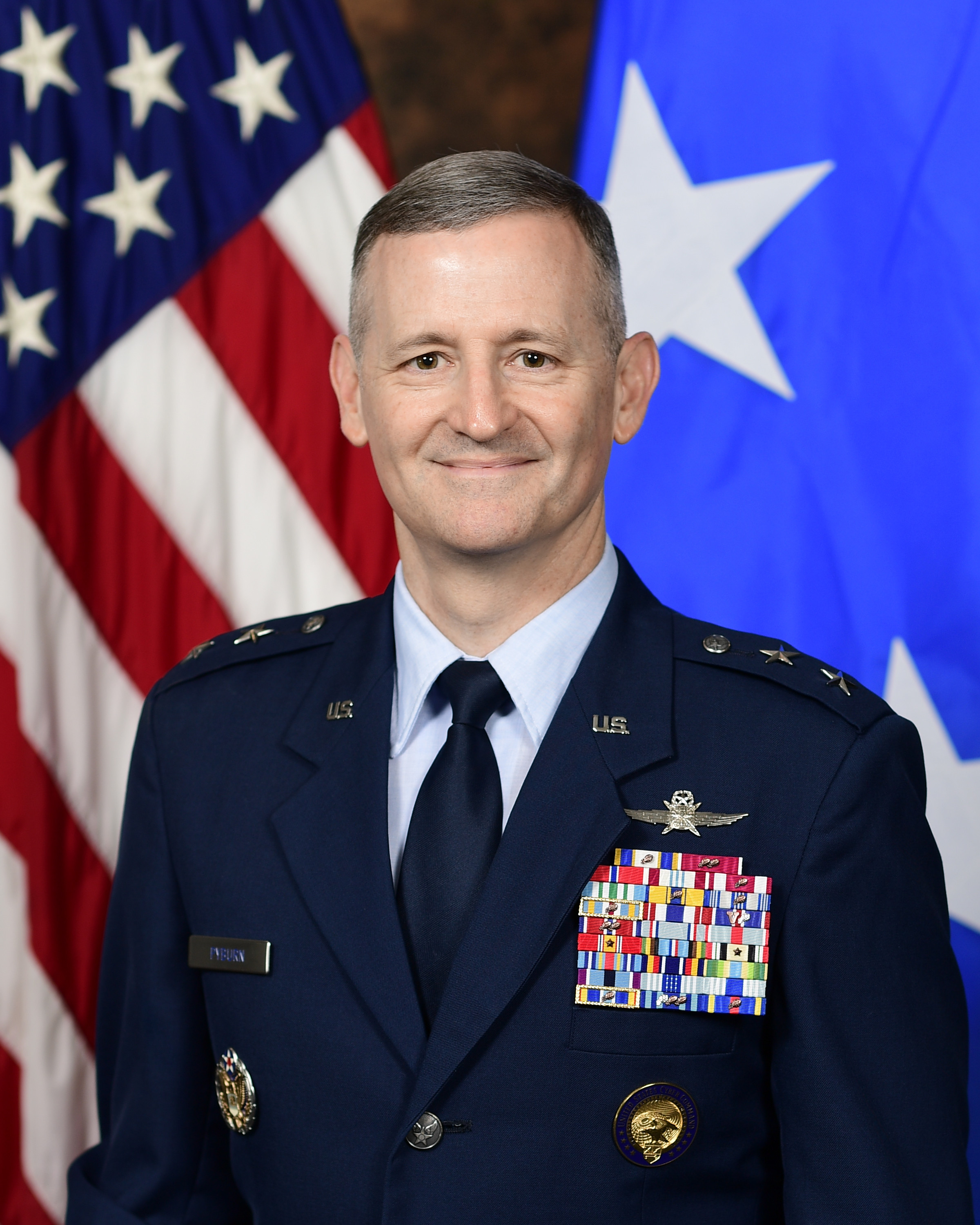
- Military career
- Allegiance: United States
- Branch: United States Air Force
- Service years: 1991–2024
- Rank: Major General
- Commands: 67th Cyberspace Wing
- Awards: Legion of Merit (3)

Bradley L. Pyburn is a retired United States Air Force major general who served as the chief of staff of the United States Cyber Command from 2022 to 2024. He previously served as the deputy commander of the Sixteenth Air Force.

In March 2022, Pyburn was reassigned as chief of staff of the United States Cyber Command. In May 2022, he was nominated for promotion to major general.

Military offices
Preceded by David W. Snoddy	Commander of the 67th Cyberspace Wing; 2016–2018	Succeeded by Melissa S. Cunningham
Preceded by Michele C. Edmondson	Senior Executive Officer to the Vice Chief of Staff of the United States Air Force; 2018–2019	Succeeded by Eric P. DeLange
Preceded by David M. Gaedecke	Director of Cyberspace Operations and Warfighter Communications of the United States Air Force; 2019–2020	Succeeded by Eric P. DeLange
Preceded by George M. Reynolds	Deputy Commander of the Sixteenth Air Force; 2020–2022	Succeeded by Melissa A. Stone
Preceded by David Isaacson	Chief of Staff of the United States Cyber Command; 2022–2024	Succeeded by Dennis Velez
