= Space Test and Training Range =

U.S. Space Force range

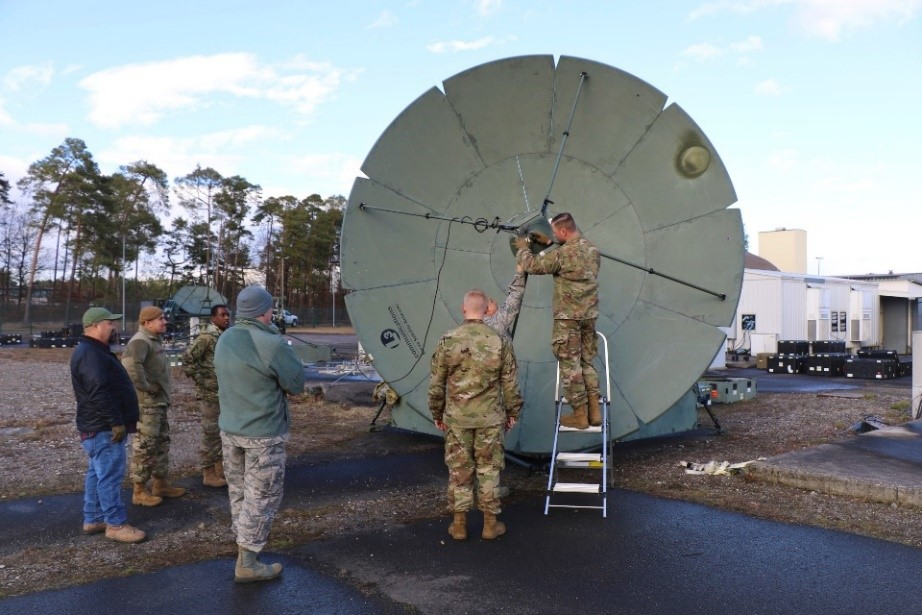
- Space Test and Training Range team members build an antenna at Ramstein Air Base, Germany, March 7, 2019.
- Active: December 2003-present
- Country: United States
- Branch: United States Space Force
- Role: Space Electronic Warfare Range
- Garrison/HQ: Schriever Air Force Base, Colorado

The Space Test and Training Range (STTR) is a space electronic warfare range controlled by the United States Space Force and is located at Schriever Air Force Base, Colorado. The 25th Space Range Squadron and their reserve associate unit, the 379th Space Range Squadron operate and maintain the STTR.

== Mission ==
The mission of the STTR is mainly operated out of the Space Range Operations Center (SROC) but the space range is also world-wide deployable. Currently, L3Harris is responsible for sustainment of the SROC. The STTR's operating contractor is currently JT4 who also assists in operating the NTTR, the Utah Test and Training Range (UTTR), and various other military ranges.

The STTR has deployed equipment and personnel to support combatant commander operations and large force exercises such as Austere Challenge.

== History ==
The space range mission was conceived by Air Force Space Command in 2001 and the creation of the Space Range Management Office occurred shortly after. On July 1, 2004, Air Force Space Command activated the 25th Space Control Tactics Squadron with a mission to develop and document space tactics, operate the Space Range and propagate approved tactics and space control employment concepts to warfighters. However, Nov. 11, 2007, the squadron was re-designated the 25th Space Range Squadron due to the focus shifting more to controlling the space range rather than developing tactics and techniques. On April 1, 2012, the STTR gained its reserve component, the 379th Space Range Squadron. Both units are located at Schriever AFB and typically work jointly to complete their mission. Then on April 1, 2013, the STTR was moved under Air Combat Command (ACC) as a subordinate mission to the NTTR.

On March 31, 2020, the United States Air Force announced it would transfer the 25th Space Range Squadron to the United States Space Force.

== Operating Units ==
- 25th Space Range Squadron
- 379th Space Range Squadron

=== Assignments ===
- 595th Space Group, 1 August 2002
- Nevada Test and Training Range, 1 April 2013 – present

=== Stations ===
- Schriever Air Force Base, Colorado, December 2003

== See also ==
- 25th Space Range Squadron
- 379th Space Range Squadron
- Nevada Test and Training Range
- Strategic Training Route Complex
