= United States Air Force Warfare Center =

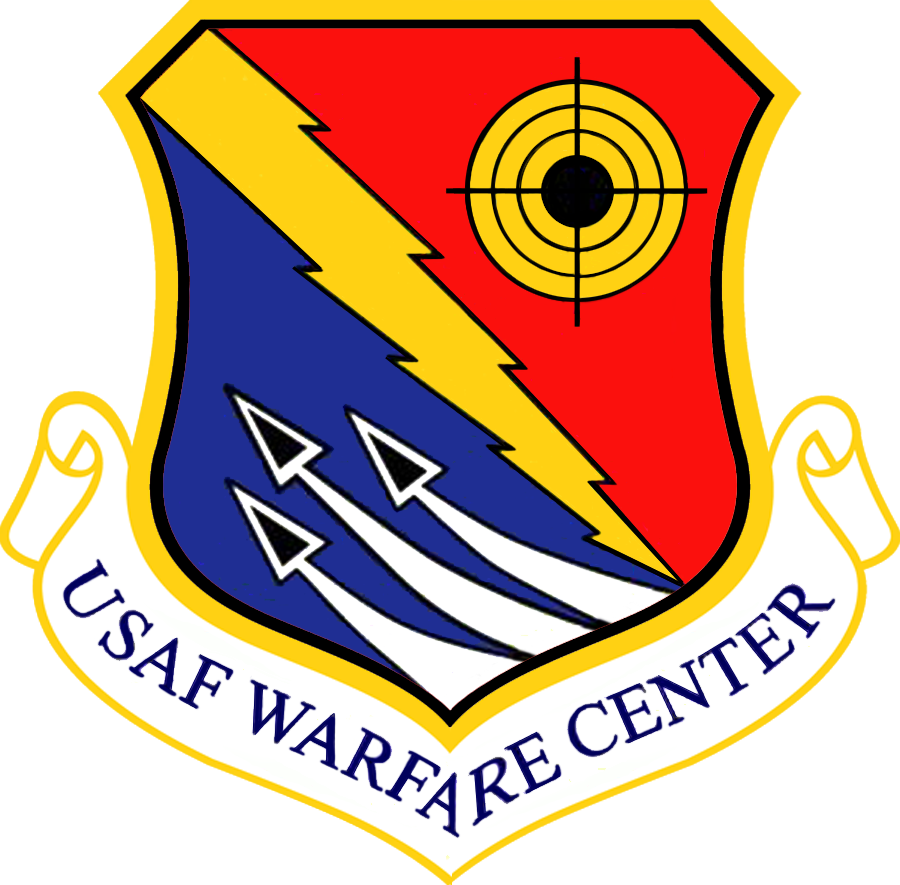
- Emblem of the United States Air Force Warfare Center
- Active: 1966–present
- Country: United States
- Branch: United States Air Force
- Role: Warfare Training
- Part of: Air Combat Command
- Garrison/HQ: Nellis AFB, Nevada
- Website: www.nellis.af.mil/Units/USAFWC/

Commanders
- Commander: Brig Gen David C. Epperson
- Vice Commander: Brig Gen Jesse J. Friedel
- Command Chief Master Sergeant: CCMSgt Emilio Hernandez

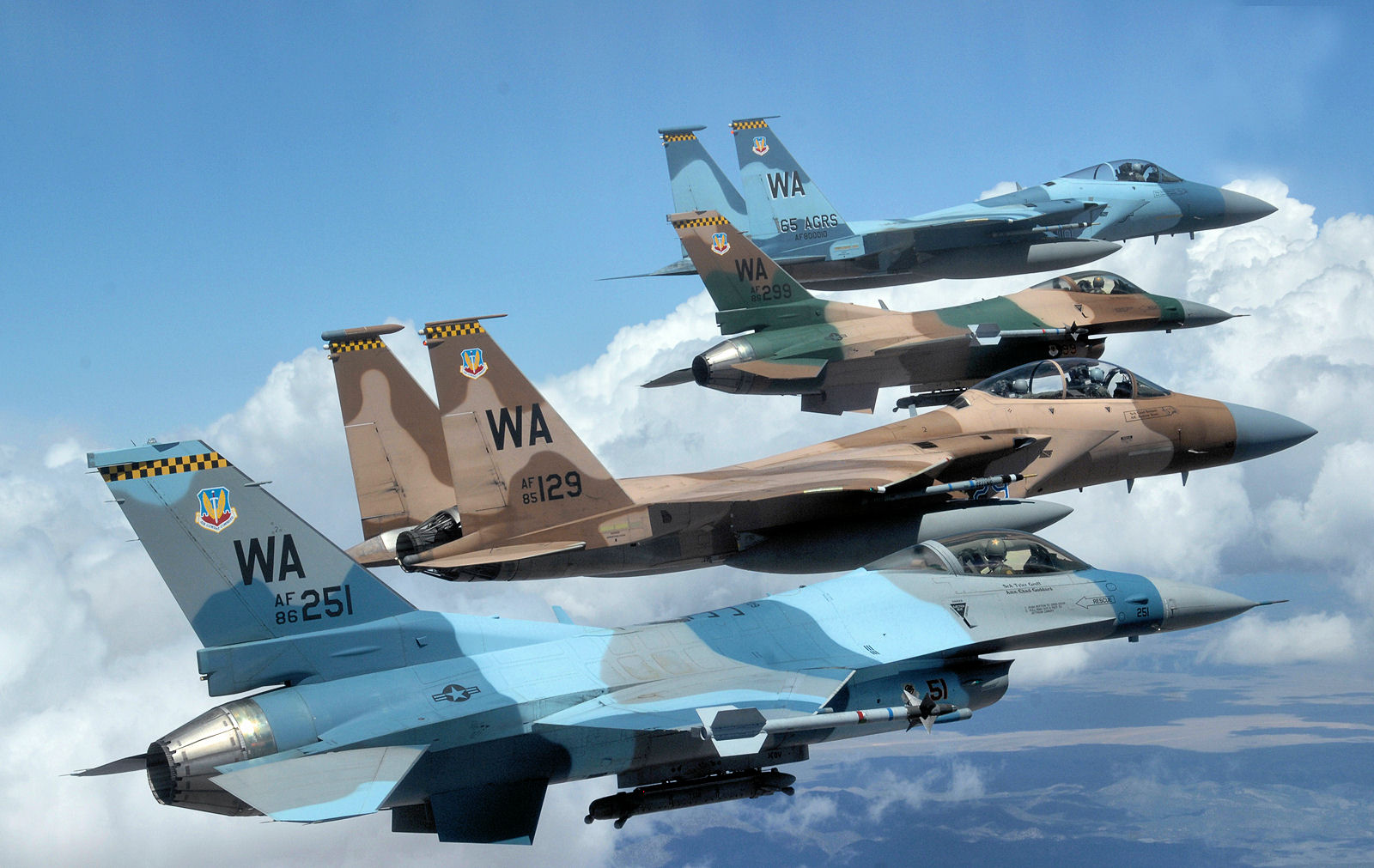
A flight of Aggressor F-15 Eagles and F-16 Fighting Falcons fly in formation over the Nevada Test and Training Range

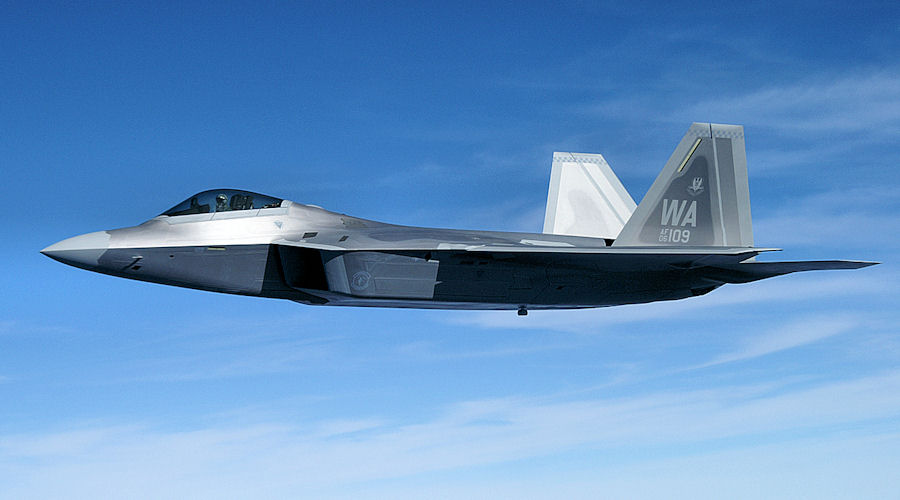
The first F-22A assigned to the USAFWC

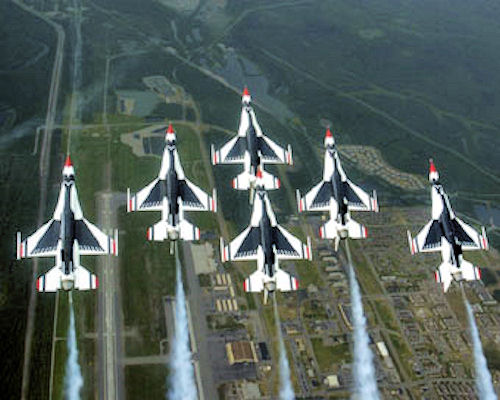
USAF Thunderbirds, part of the United States Air Force Warfare Center

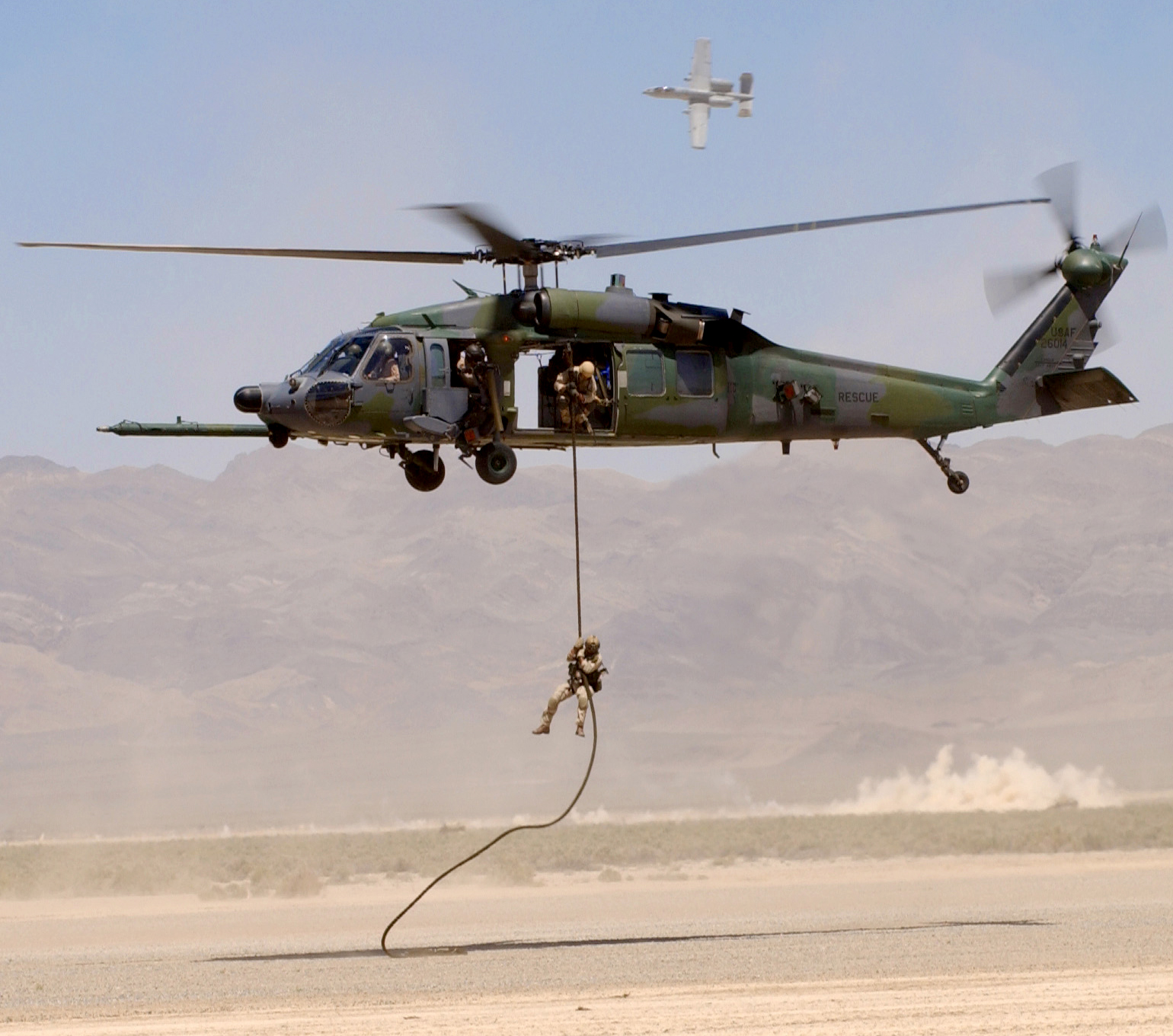
An HH-60G Pave Hawk retrieves a pararescueman as an A-10 Thunderbolt II provides cover fire during a firepower demonstration on the Nellis bombing range.

The United States Air Force Warfare Center (USAFWC) at Nellis Air Force Base, Nevada, reports directly to Air Combat Command. The center was founded on 1 September 1966, as the U.S. Air Force Tactical Fighter Weapons Center. It was renamed the U.S. Air Force Warfare Center in 2005.

== Overview ==
The USAF Warfare Center manages advanced pilot training and integrates many of the Air Force's test and evaluation requirements. It was established in 1966 as the USAF Tactical Fighter Weapons Center which concentrated on the development of forces and weapons systems that were specifically geared to tactical air operations in conventional (non-nuclear) war and contingencies. It continued to perform this mission for nearly thirty years, undergoing several name changes in the 1990s. In 1991, the center became the USAF Fighter Weapons Center, and then the USAF Weapons and Tactics Center in 1992.

The USAF Warfare Center uses the lands and airspace of the Nevada Test and Training Range (NTTR) – which occupies about three million acres (12,000 km^{2}) of land, the largest such range in the United States, and another five-million-acre (20,000 km^{2}) military operating area which is shared with civilian aircraft. The center also uses Eglin AFB, FL, range, which adds even greater depth to the center's capabilities, providing over water and additional electronic expertise to the center.

The USAF Warfare Center oversees operations of the 57th Wing, the NTTR, and the 99th Air Base Wings at Nellis AFB, Nevada; the 53d Wing (with Geographically Separated Units at Tyndall AFB, Florida and Holloman AFB, New Mexico) and 350th Spectrum Warfare Wing at Eglin AFB, Florida; and the 505th Command and Control Wing at Hurlburt Field, Florida.

== Units ==
- 53d Wing (53 WG)

The 53d Wing serves as the focal point for the combat air forces in electronic combat, armament and avionics, chemical defense, reconnaissance, command and control, and aircrew training devices.

- 57th Wing (57 WG)

The 57th Wing is responsible for a variety of activities, such as Red Flag, which provides realistic training in a combined air, ground and electronic threat environment for U.S. and allied forces. It is also the parent unit for both the USAF Weapons School (USAFWS) and the USAF Air Demonstration Squadron, the latter better known as the United States Air Force Thunderbirds.

- Nevada Test and Training Range (NTTR)

Previously known as the 98th Range Wing (98 RANW), the military organization known as NTTR provides command and control of the actual Nevada Test and Training Range facility located north and northwest of Nellis AFB. The 25th Space Range Squadron (SRS) operates and maintains the Space Test and Training Range and is a subordinate unit the NTTR.

- 99th Air Base Wing (99 ABW)

The 99th Air Base Wing is the host wing at Nellis AFB and manages the day-to-day operations of the base.

- 350th Spectrum Warfare Wing (350 SWW)

- 505th Command and Control Wing (505 CCW)

The 505 CCW is dedicated to improving warfighter readiness through integrated training, tactics, and testing for operational-level command and control of air, space, and cyber power. It hosts the Air Force's only Air Operations Center Formal Training Unit (FTU).

== History ==
By the mid-1960s, USAF aircraft and aircrew losses in the Vietnam War had convinced Tactical Air Command (TAC) of the need to improve technical and operational skills for the widening conflict. TAC established the Tactical Fighter Weapons Center at Nellis Air Force Base, Nevada in 1966 for the expressed purpose of improving fighter operations and tactics. Nellis AFB had been referred to as the "Home of the Fighter Pilot" since the Korean War period of the early 1950s, and had a long history of conducting postgraduate fighter training and operational testing and evaluation of fighter weapons systems. Additionally, the Nellis Range, largest in the free world, readily complemented the new center's mission.

=== Lineage ===
- Established as the USAF Tactical Fighter Weapons Center in 1966

Redesignated: USAF Fighter Weapons Center in 1991
Redesignated: USAF Weapons and Tactics Center in 1992
Redesignated: USAF Warfare Center in 2005.

=== Assignments ===
- Tactical Air Command, 1966 – 1992
- Air Combat Command, 1992 – present

=== Units assigned ===
Operational units assigned to the USAFWC have been:

Wing

- 4545th Fighter Warfare Wing, 1966 – 22 August 1969
- 57th Fighter Weapons Wing (later 57th Tactical Training Wing, 57th Fighter Wing, 57th Wing), 22 August 1969 – present
- 350th Spectrum Warfare Wing - ?? - present

Groups

- 57th Fighter, 1 November 1991 – present
- 57th Test, 1 November 1991 – 1 October 1996
- 4440th Tactical Fighter Training (Red Flag)

Attached 1 October 1979 – 28 February 1980
Assigned 1 March 1980 – 1 November 1991

- 4443d Tactical Training: 26 January 1990 – 1 November 1991

Squadrons

- 64th Fighter Weapons (later, 64th Tactical Fighter Training Aggressor; 64th Aggressor): 15 October 1972 – 5 October 1990.
- 65th Fighter Weapons (later, 65th Tactical Fighter Training Aggressor; 65th Aggressor): 15 October 1969 – 7 April 1989.
- 66th Fighter Weapons: 15 October 1969 – 30 December 1981
- 414th Fighter Weapons: 15 October 1969 – 30 December 1981
- 422d Fighter Weapons (later, 422d Test and Evaluation): 15 October 1969 – 1 November 1991
- 431st Fighter Weapons (later, 431st Test and Evaluation): 1 October 1980 – 1 November 1991
- 433d Fighter Weapons: 1 October 1976 – 30 December 1981
- 4460th Helicopter: 1 November 1983 – 1 June 1985
- 4477th Test and Evaluation Flight (later, 4477th Test and Evaluation Squadron): 1 April 1977 – 15 July 1990
- USAF Air Demonstration Squadron: 15 February 1974 – present

=== Aircraft flown ===
- A-7 Corsair II, 1969 – 1975
- F-4 Phantom II, 1969 – 1985, 1992 – 2016

F-4G Wild Weasel, 1992 – 1995
QF-4 and QRF-4 Phantom II (Drone), 1993 – 2016

- F-100 Super Sabre, 1969 – 1972

QF-100 Super Sabre (Drone), 1983 – 1993

- F-105 Thunderchief, 1969 – 1975
- QF-106 Delta Dart (Drone), 1991–1996
- General Dynamics F-111, 1969 – 1995
- T-38 Talon, 1972 – 1990
- Northrop F-5, 1975 – 1989
- UH-1 Iroquois, 1981 – 1985
- B-1 Lancer, 1993 – 1999
- B-52 Stratofortress, 1993 – 1999
- MQ-1 Predator, 1995 – 2018
- F-22 Raptor, 2004 – present
- F-35 Lightning II, 2014 – present
- F-15 Eagle, 1976 – present

F-15E Strike Eagle, 1992 – present
F-15EX Eagle II, 2021 – present

- A-10 Thunderbolt II, 1977 – present
- F-16 Fighting Falcon, 1980 – present
- MQ-9 Reaper, 2007 – present

== List of commanders ==
No.	Commander		Term		
No.	Portrait	Name	Took office	Left office	Duration
1	Ralph G. Taylor Jr.	Major General; Ralph G. Taylor Jr.	1 September 1966	15 December 1969	3 years, 82 days
2	Homer K. Hansen	Brigadier General; Homer K. Hansen	22 November 1969	23 July 1971	1 year, 243 days
3	William S. Chairsell	Major General; William S. Chairsell	23 July 1971	29 June 1973	1 year, 341 days
4	Gordon F. Blood	Major General; Gordon F. Blood	29 June 1973	10 February 1975	1 year, 226 days
5	James A. Knight Jr.	Major General; James A. Knight Jr.	10 February 1975	12 June 1977	2 years, 122 days
6	James R. Hildreth	Major General; James R. Hildreth	12 June 1977	30 March 1979	1 year, 291 days
7	Robert E. Kelley	Major General; Robert E. Kelley	30 March 1979	3 June 1981	2 years, 65 days
8	Jack I. Gregory	Major General; Jack I. Gregory	3 June 1981	11 May 1983	1 year, 342 days
9	Eugene H. Fischer	Major General; Eugene H. Fischer	11 May 1983	13 July 1985	2 years, 63 days
10	Peter T. Kempf	Major General; Peter T. Kempf	13 July 1985	21 June 1988	2 years, 344 days
11	Joseph W. Ashy	Major General; Joseph W. Ashy	21 June 1988	19 July 1989	1 year, 28 days
12	Billy G. McCoy	Major General; Billy G. McCoy	19 July 1989	5 June 1992	2 years, 322 days
13	Thomas R. Griffith	Major General; Thomas R. Griffith	5 June 1992	21 July 1994	2 years, 46 days
14	Richard C. Bethurem	Major General; Richard C. Bethurem	21 July 1994	4 April 1996	1 year, 258 days
15	Marvin R. Esmond	Major General; Marvin R. Esmond	4 April 1996	7 July 1998	2 years, 94 days
16	Glen W. Moorhead III	Major General; Glen W. Moorhead III	7 July 1998	31 January 2000	1 year, 208 days
17	Lawrence D. Johnston	Major General; Lawrence D. Johnston	31 January 2000	25 June 2002	2 years, 145 days
18	Stephen G. Wood	Major General; Stephen G. Wood	25 June 2002	4 October 2004	2 years, 101 days
19	Stephen M. Goldfein	Major General; Stephen M. Goldfein	4 October 2004	6 October 2006	2 years, 2 days
20	R. Michael Worden	Major General; R. Michael Worden	6 October 2006	8 February 2008	1 year, 125 days
21	Stephen L. Hoog	Major General; Stephen L. Hoog	8 February 2008	18 May 2009	1 year, 99 days
22	Stanley T. Kresge	Major General; Stanley T. Kresge	18 May 2009	November 2010	1 year, 167 days
22	James W. Hyatt	Major General; James W. Hyatt	November 2010	20 July 2012	1 year, 262 days
23	Jeffrey G. Lofgren	Major General; Jeffrey G. Lofgren	20 July 2012	January 2014	1 year, 165 days
24	Jay B. Silveria	Major General; Jay B. Silveria	21 February 2014	March 2016	2 years, 9 days
25	Glen D. VanHerck	Major General; Glen D. VanHerck	March 2016	13 July 2017	1 year, 134 days
26	Peter E. Gersten	Major General; Peter E. Gersten	13 July 2017	2 June 2019	1 year, 324 days
-	David W. Snoddy	Brigadier General; David W. Snoddy; Acting	2 June 2019	12 July 2019	40 days
27	Charles Corcoran	Major General; Charles Corcoran	12 July 2019	18 June 2021	1 year, 341 days
28	Case Cunningham	Major General; Case Cunningham	18 June 2021	6 August 2024	3 years, 49 days
29	Christopher J. Niemi	Major General; Christopher J. Niemi	6 August 2024	28 August 2025	1 year, 22 days
30	David C. Epperson	Brigadier General; David C. Epperson	28 August 2025	Incumbent	80 days
