= 99th Air Base Wing =

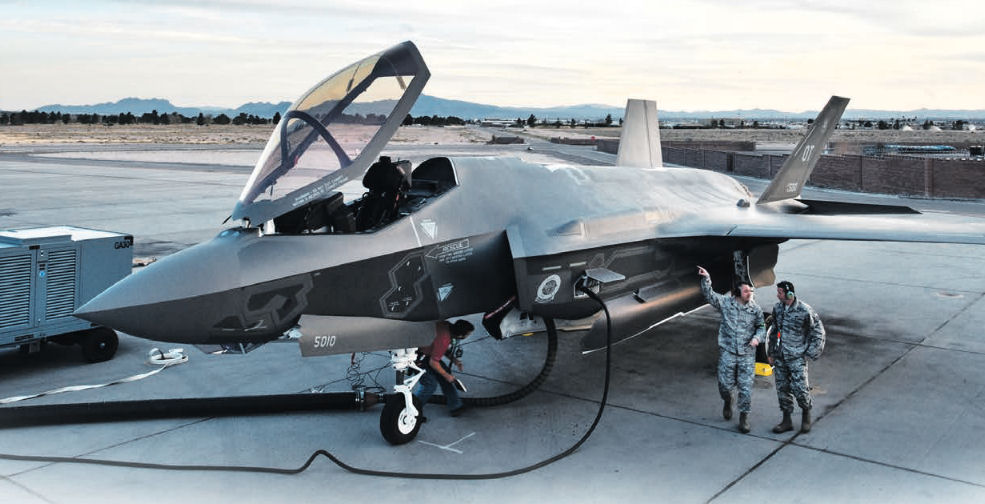
- F-35A Lightning II at Nellis AFB, Nevada for operational testing
- Active: 1942–1945; 1947–1949; 1953–1974; 1989–1993; 1995–present
- Country: United States
- Branch: United States Air Force
- Role: Air base support
- Part of: Air Combat Command
- Garrison/HQ: Nellis Air Force Base
- Motto: Sight With Might (1953-1958) Caveant Aggressores (Latin for 'Let Agressors Beware')(1958-present)
- Engagements: World War II – EAME Theater; Vietnam War – Operation Arc Light

- Decorations: Distinguished Unit Citation (2x); Air Force Outstanding Unit Award (10x)

Commanders
- Current commander: Col. Christine R. Littlejohn
- Notable commanders: Richard C. Sanders; Robert C. Hinson

Insignia
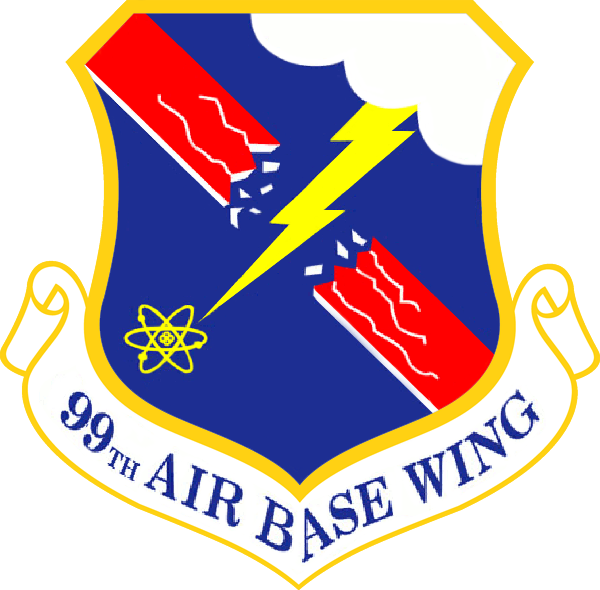
- 99th Air Base Wing emblem (Note: Approved 7 February 1958.)

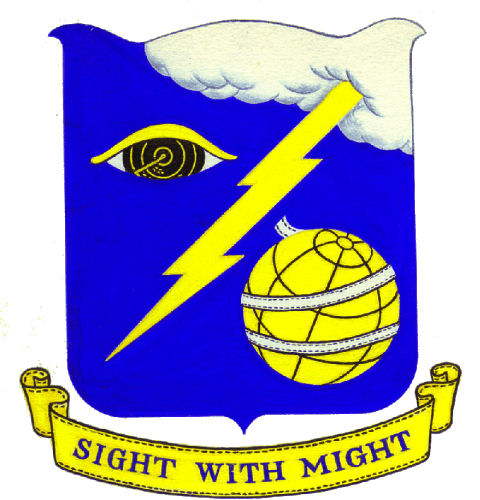
- 99th Strategic Reconnaissance Wing emblem (Note: Approved 3 November 1953.)
- World War II tail marking: Diamond (later with Y inside)

The 99th Air Base Wing is a United States Air Force unit assigned to the Air Combat Command (ACC) and its ACC subordinate organization, the United States Air Force Warfare Center. It is based at Nellis Air Force Base, Nevada and also serves as the host wing at Nellis.

A non-flying wing, the organization oversees the daily base operations and mission support functions of Nellis such as personnel, finance, civil engineering, security and supply.

The wing is the successor to the World War II 99th Bombardment Group. The group moved to Algeria in March 1943, where the group and its Boeing B-17 Flying Fortress aircraft distinguished themselves while flying bombing missions against targets in Italy, Sardinia and Sicily. In August 1943, aircrews moved to Oudna, Tunisia and then, in December 1943, moved to Italy and conducted missions throughout Europe. Active for over 60 years, the 99th Strategic Reconnaissance Wing was part of Strategic Air Command's deterrent force during the Cold War, as a strategic reconnaissance wing.

The 99th Air Base Wing is commanded by Col. Todd Dyer. Its Command Chief Master Sergeant is Chief Master Sergeant Morgan III.

== Components ==
The wing has two groups: the 99th Medical Group and the 99th Mission Support Group. The 99th Comptroller Squadron is assigned directly to the wing.

- 99th Comptroller Squadron – The mission of the 99th Comptroller Squadron is to provide professional financial management services to the organizations and individuals at Nellis.
- 99th Medical Group – Provides medical care for the military community to ensure maximum wartime readiness and combat capability. The group's functions include flight medicine, surgical services, maternal and childcare, pharmacy, laboratory, radiology, dental care, medical benefits and information and diagnostic and therapeutic services.
  - 99th Medical Support Squadron
  - 99th Operational Medical Readiness Squadron
  - 99th Healthcare Operations Squadron
  - 99th Dental Squadron
  - 99th Inpatient Squadron
  - 99th Surgical Squadron
- 99th Mission Support Group – Provides civil engineer, communications, contracting, logistics readiness, personnel and services support for Nellis and Creech AFB
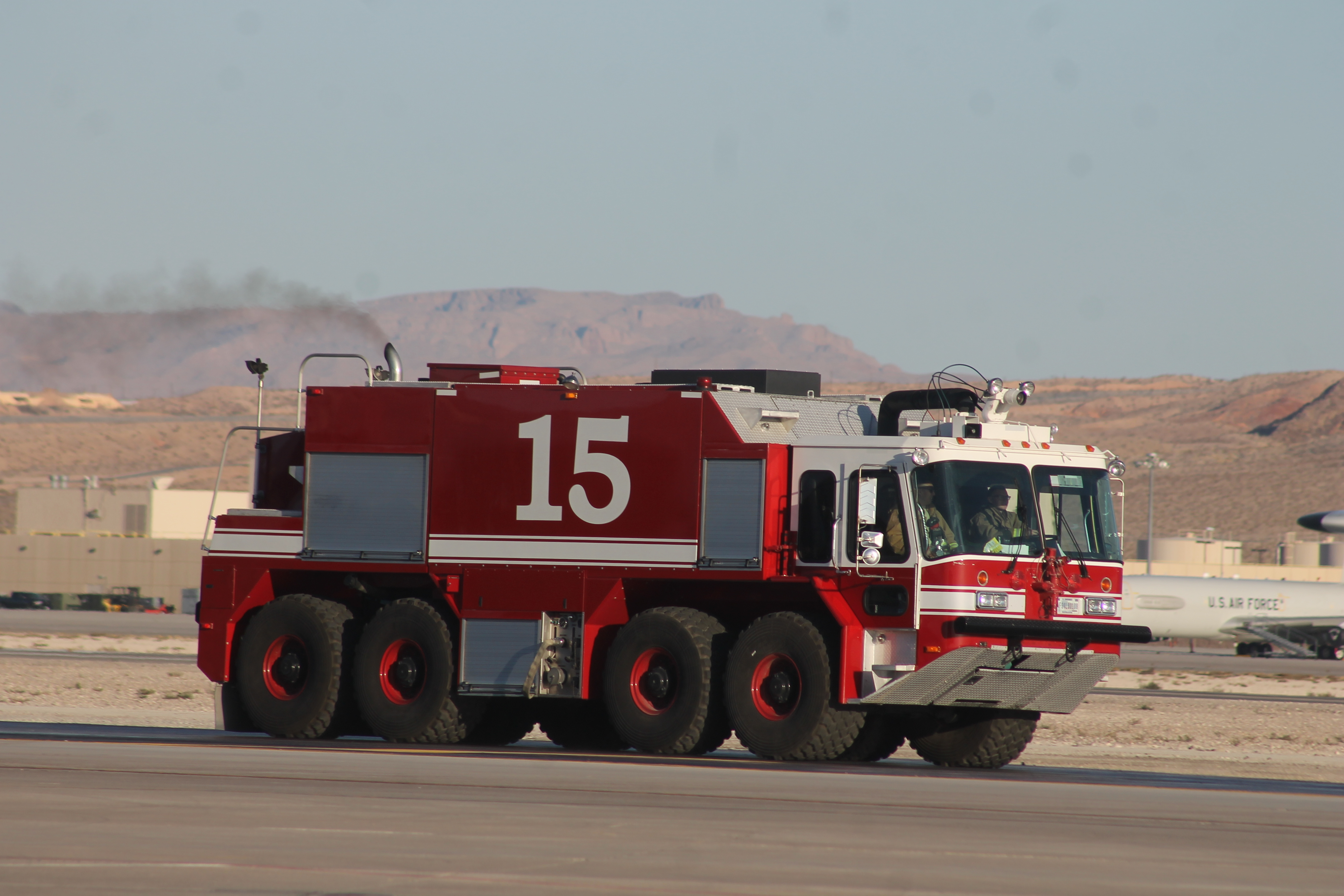
  - A crash tender of the 99th Civil Engineer Squadron.
    99th Civil Engineer Squadron – Provides maintenance, repair, design and construction support for facilities and infrastructure, fire protection and crash rescue, disaster preparedness, military family housing, environmental compliance and explosive ordnance disposal.
  - 99th Communications Squadron – Programs, operates and maintains the base computer networks and telecommunications systems.
  - 99th Contracting Squadron – Executes the base central acquisition and contract performance management program.
  - 99th Logistics Readiness Squadron – Provides motor vehicle operations and maintenance, traffic management and supply orders.
  - 99th Force Support Squadron – Includes military and civilian personnel, education services, enlisted professional education and family support. The squadron also provides services for lodging, food services, club management, laundry, mortuary affairs, base honor guard, base library and recreational activities.
  - 99th Security Forces Squadron – Provides security, law enforcement services and force protection for Nellis and Creech Air Force Base.

== History ==
=== World War II ===
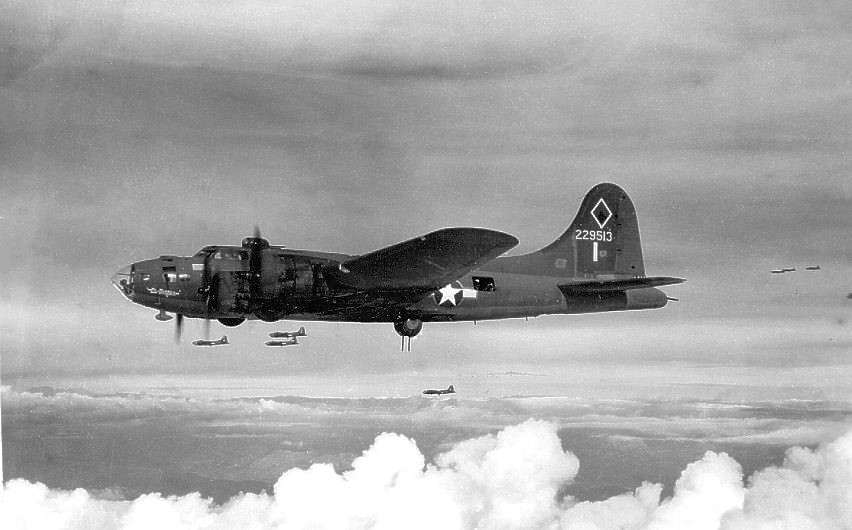
B-17F 42-29513

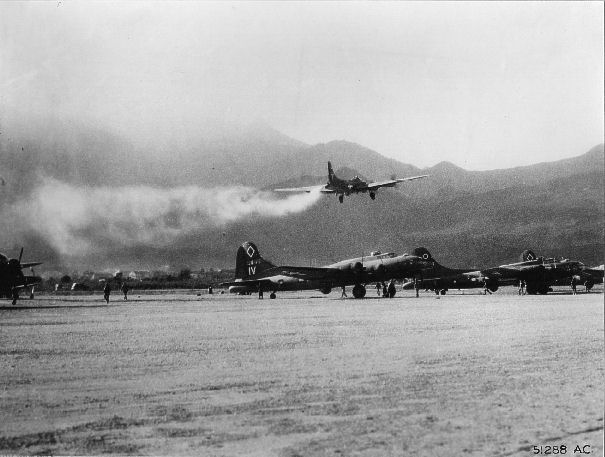
Emergency landing at Tortorella Airfield in Italy, 1944

On 25 September 1942, the 99th Bombardment Group (Heavy) was activated at Gowen Field near Boise, Idaho. The 99th consisted of the 346th, 347th, 348th, and 416th Bombardment Squadrons. Due to congestion at Gowen Field, the 99th relocated to Walla Walla Army Air Field, Washington.

During October, the 99th received twelve flight leaders with crews, and four Boeing B-17 Flying Fortress bombers. During the first phase of training, the 99th received six more B-17s. The winter weather in Washington was not favorable for flying, so the 99th relocated to Sioux City Army Air Base, Iowa for the second phase of training. By the middle of November, the 99th had acquired about seventy five percent of its ground and support personnel. The third phase of training took place at Smoky Hill Army Air Field, Salina, Kansas in January 1943.

After completion of training, the 99th departed the United States from Morrison Field, Florida in February. The 99th B-17s flew the southern route via Borinquen Field, Puerto Rico; Georgetown, British Guiana; Belém, Brazil; Bathurst, the Gambia; to their destination at Marrakesh, Morocco. The ground and support personnel and equipment made the journey by ship.

Upon arrival in North Africa, the 99th was assigned to was attached to the 5th Bombardment Wing of Twelfth Air Force, and was stationed at Navarin, located near Constantine, Algeria. The group came to be referred to as the Diamondbacks, due to a diamond insignia painted on the vertical stabilizer of their B-17s.

The 99th flew its first combat mission on 31 March against an enemy airdrome at Villacidro, Sardinia. As Allied ground forces forced the German Afrika Korps to retreat into Tunisia, the 99th flew missions to cut off German supplies coming from Italy and Sicily. For the rest of 1943, the 99th flew missions primarily across the Mediterranean to bomb targets in Sicily and Italy. In June, news of a possible Arab uprising had the men of the 99th nervous and wearing side arms at all times. Although a major uprising never occurred, there were acts of sabotage; including a small night time German paratrooper drop over Oudna Field, Tunisia that resulted in the capture of three Germans.

Summer dust storms made life miserable. On 5 July the group bombed an airfield at Gerbini, Sicily. An estimated one hundred enemy fighters made repetitive and fierce attacks, trying to turn the 99th back. The group however penetrated enemy defenses, and destroyed the airfield. For this mission, the 99th received its first Distinguished Unit Citation. On 9 July, the group flew missions in support of the Operation Husky, the Allied invasion of Sicily. The first Allied air attack on Rome took place on 14 July. Great care was taken by the 99th to avoid dropping any bombs on the Vatican City.

On 1 November 1943, the four B-17 groups of the 5th Wing and two B-24 groups of the Ninth Air Force were combined with two fighter groups to form the new Fifteenth Air Force. On its first day of existence, the 15th flew a 1,600-mile round trip to bomb the Messerschmitt aircraft factory at Wiener Neustadt, Austria. With the Allied advancement up the boot of Italy, it was decided to relocate the 5th Wing there in order to bring more Axis targets within reach of the bombers. Each group was assigned a base on the Foggia plains, the 99th being stationed at Tortorella Airfield. The planes arrived at their new base in December 1943. Living conditions at Tortorella were very harsh. The summers were hot and dusty, the winters cold and wet. Buildings were few, and airplane maintenance crews worked out in the open. The men lived in tents using homemade gasoline stoves for heat. The men constantly had to struggle through mud and water, snow and ice, or choking dust, depending on the season.

Throughout 1944, the 99th bombed targets in German-occupied Italy, Germany, Austria, Greece, Bulgaria, France, Romania, Hungary, Yugoslavia, and Czechoslovakia. Two more B-17 groups, the 463rd and 483rd, would be added to the 5th Wing in March 1944. On 23 April the group bombed an aircraft factory at Weiner Neustadt, Austria. The 99th was the lead group on this mission. The flak was intense, and aggressive fighter opposition was encountered but no planes were lost. Despite the heavy opposition, the 99th made a highly successful bomb run. Thirty-one of the group's airplanes returned to base, riddled with flak and bullet holes. For this mission, the 99th received its second Distinguished Unit Citation.

During the last half of May, rumors were going around that "something big" was in the works. The rumors became fact at 2:00 am on the morning of 2 June, when it was made known that the group was going to bomb a railroad yard at Debrecen, Hungary, and fly on to land at Poltava, Russia in the Ukraine. This shuttle bombing exercise was labelled Operation Frantic. At the briefing, the aircrews were told that "One hundred thirty-million Americans will look upon you today and you are their representatives in a land where you will be the first American combat men." The bombing that day was excellent, and no flak or enemy fighters were encountered. The 99th became the first task force of the USAAF to land on Russian soil. The first three days in Russia were non-operational. The men of the 99th spent their time sightseeing and making friends with the Russians. The Russian civilians cheered and saluted the "Americanyetts." On 6 June, the 99th flew a mission from Poltava, to bomb the German airfield at Galați, Romania. After landing back at Poltava, the men of the 99th learned that the Allies had invaded Europe on the beaches of France. On 11 June, the 99th took off to bomb a German airfield at Focşani, Romania. They continued on to land back at Tortorella. The first shuttle mission to Russia was deemed to be a success.

Operation Dragoon, the invasion of Southern France, began on 15 August. The group flew missions on the 13th and 14th, destroying German gun emplacements and lines of communication near Toulon, France. The mission of the 15th, was in direct support of Allied invasion forces. The invasion of Southern France got little media attention because it had been overshadowed by the Normandy invasion on 6 June.

In April 1945, the 99th supported the Allied offensive in the Po Valley. It flew its 395th, and last, combat mission on 26 April 1945. Heavy clouds prevented the target from being sighted so no bombs were dropped.

The group flew a total of 10,855 combat sorties in eighteen months of operation. The group was inactivated in Italy on 8 November 1945. It flew 395 combat missions; 69 aircraft were lost.

=== Strategic Reconnaissance from 1953 ===
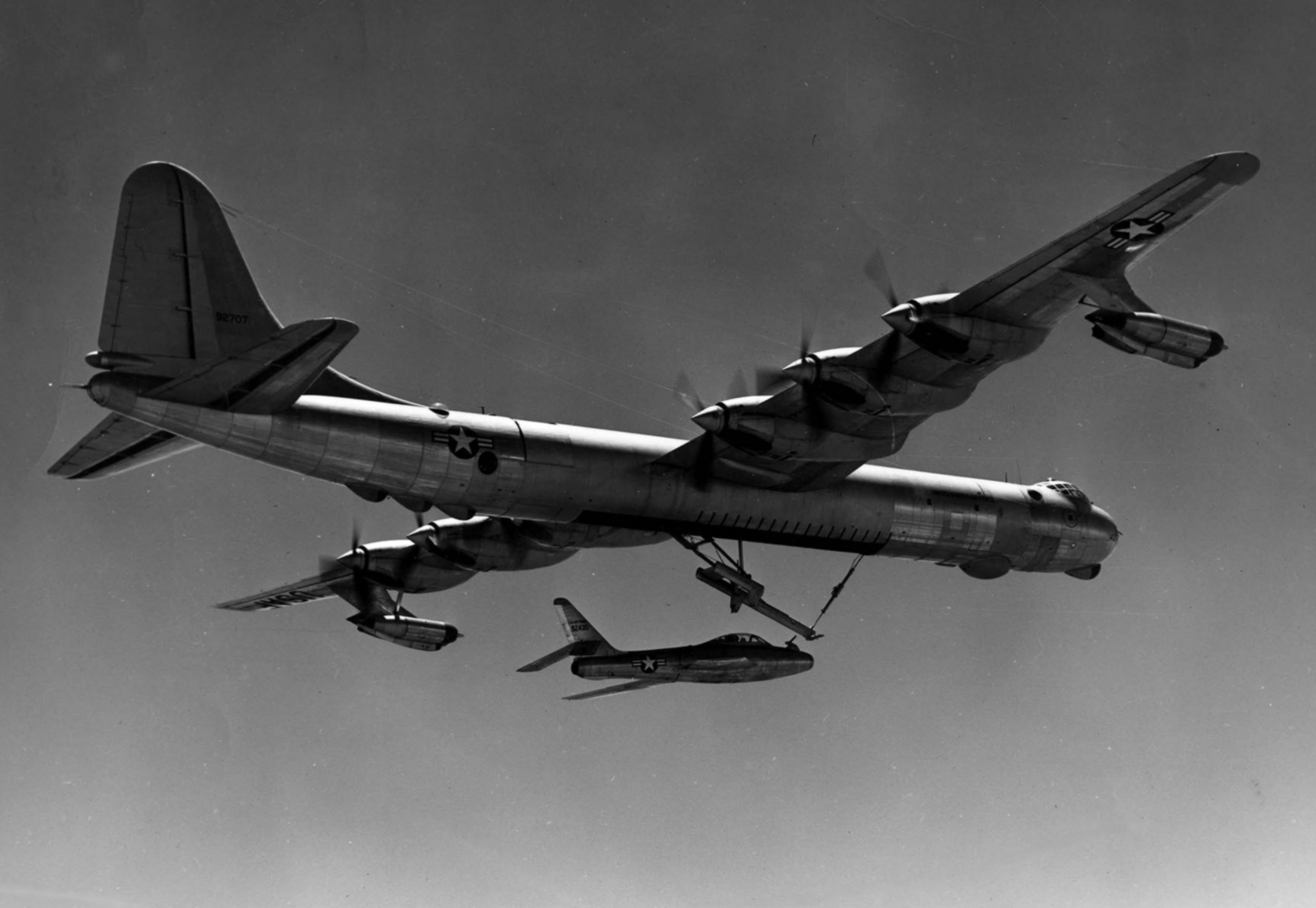
FICON testing, 1952

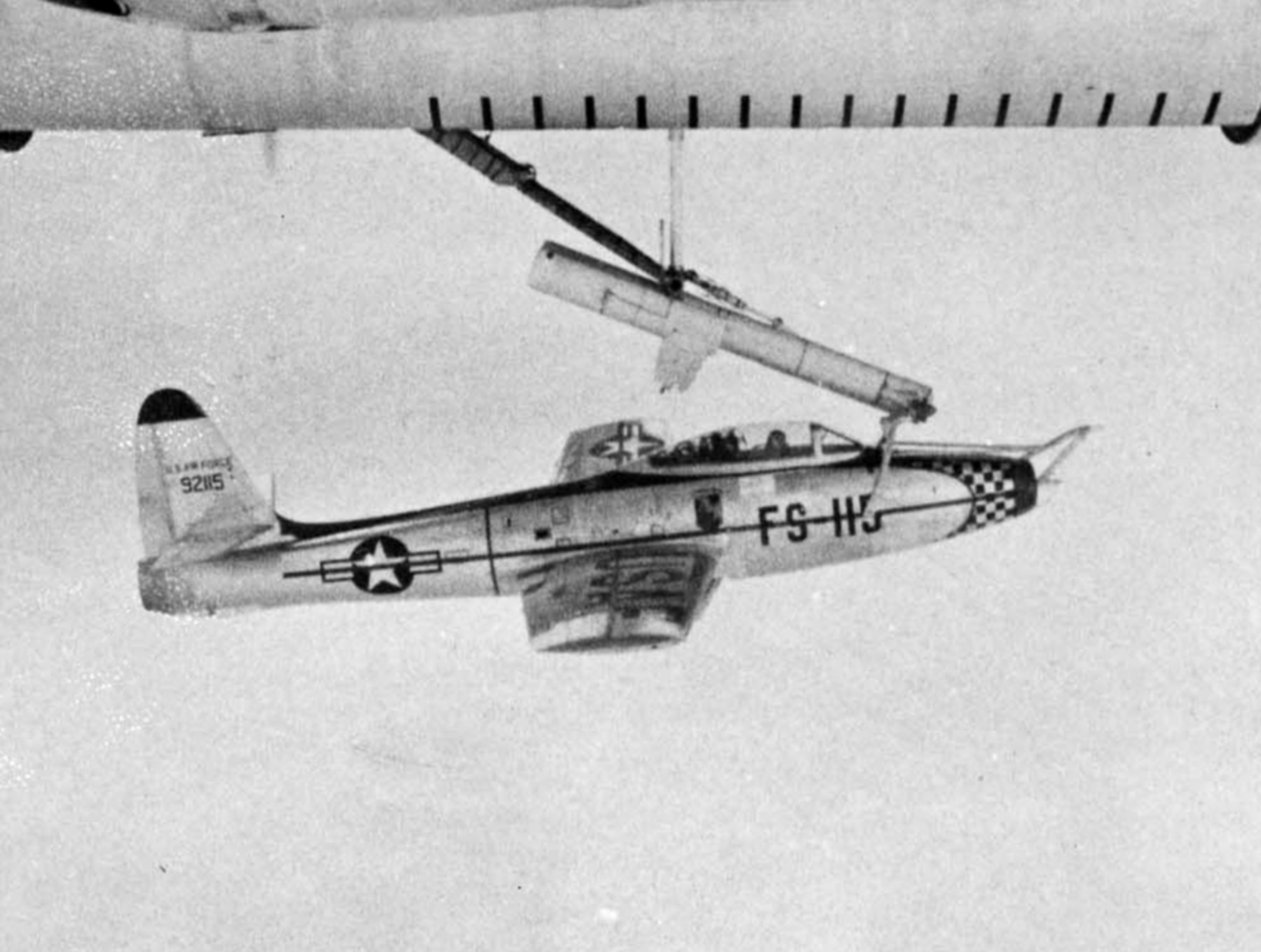
Close-up of modified FICON F-84

The 99th Strategic Reconnaissance Wing was activated in January 1953, replacing the Pennsylvania Air National Guard's 111th Strategic Reconnaissance Wing at Fairchild Air Force Base, Washington, which was activated during the Korean War. The 99th was assigned to the Strategic Air Command's Fifteenth Air Force, 57th Air Division. Its operational squadrons were the 346th, 347th and 348th Reconnaissance squadrons, assuming the Boeing RB-29 Superfortress aircraft of the departing 111th.

Beginning in the last quarter 1952, the wing began receiving the RB-36 reconnaissance version of the Convair B-36 Peacemaker intercontinental bomber at Fairchild. The wing performed worldwide photographic, electronic, and visual day and night strategic reconnaissance as its primary mission until late 1954, and until September 1956 as a secondary mission.

From January 1955 to February 1956, the wing participated in the FICON (FIghter CONveyor) project, which was a project to extend the range of reconnaissance jets by having them operate as parasites from B-36 bombers. Starting in 1955, the wing began to receive ten GRB-36Ds, which had been modified with equipment to stow, service, release, and retrieve Republic RF-84K Thunderflash aircraft assigned to the 91st Strategic Reconnaissance Squadron of the 71st Strategic Reconnaissance Wing at nearby Larson Air Force Base, Washington. Carrier aircraft retained their electronic reconnaissance equipment, but this was relocated aft of the bomb bays to accommodate the parasite jets. Within two years, SAC phased out all its fighter type aircraft and FICON ended.

On 16 June 1954 the wing, along with SAC's other B-36 reconnaissance wings were assigned bombing as their primary mission. However, they retained their designations as reconnaissance wings until 1956. The wing deployed its B-36s to Andersen Air Force Base, Guam, January–April 1956. The wing was reassigned to the Eighth Air Force's 57th Air Division on 4 September 1956.

=== Bombardment 1956–74 ===
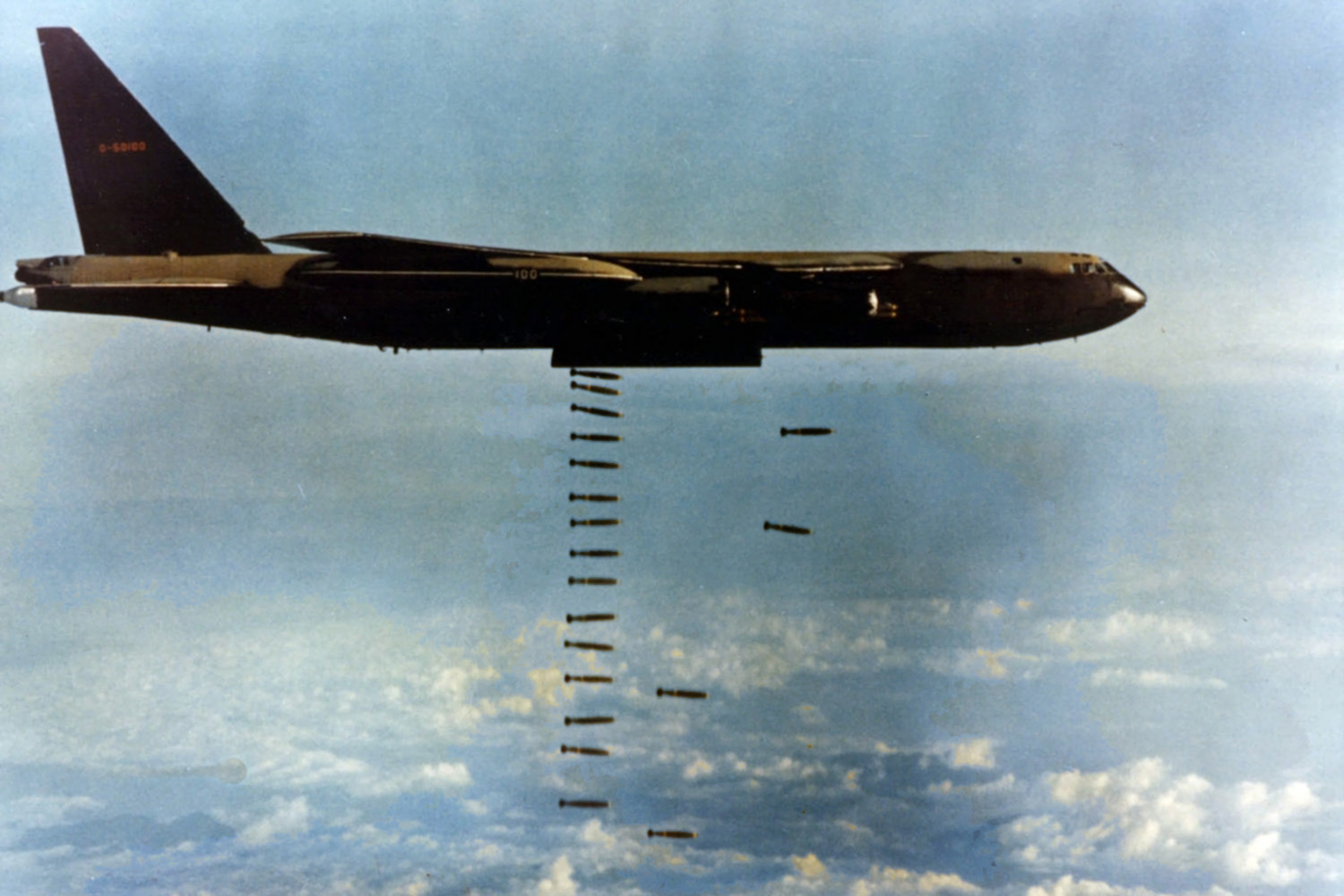
B-52D on a mission over Southeast Asia

On 4 September 1956, the wing moved to Westover Air Force Base, Massachusetts, and was redesignated the 99th Bombardment Wing, Heavy on 1 October. Its B-36s were being phased out of the inventory, and the 99th soon began receiving the new Boeing B-52C Stratofortress. The wing flew the B-52Cs until the latter half of the 1960s when their B-52Cs were redistributed among a number of different B-52D units and operated primarily as crew trainers. The 99th was upgraded to the B-52D in 1966, while still keeping several B-52Cs until they were retired in 1971. During the Vietnam War, the B-52Ds of the 99th were routinely deployed in rotations to combat duty in Southeast Asia, finally returning to Westover in 1973. During the Christmas 1972 Operation Linebacker II bombing of Hanoi, two 99th Bombardment Wing crews were shot down, several crew members were killed in action and the remaining crew members were returned from prisoner of war status, with the exception of USAF Chief Master Sergeant Arthur Vincent McLaughlin, Jr., gunner. CMSgt McLaughlin was tail gunner on a B-52D, (tail number 56-0622, call sign "Orange 03"). His body nor any DNA has to date been recovered and he is still officially listed as Unaccounted for/MIA, and under Defense POW/MIA Accounting Agency (DPAA) is listed as Active Pursuit.

In 1956, the 99th also received the new Boeing KC-135 Stratotanker and began its refueling mission. In January 1966, it added air refueling capability to its mission. The KC-135 tanker squadron also operated Boeing EC-135s in a Post-Attack Command Control System role until April 1970. In the late 1960s through early 1972 the 99th Air Refueling Squadron maintained several aircraft on satellite alert at Otis Air Force Base, Massachusetts. Beginning in 1967, all wing tactical and maintenance assets, and some support resources, were rotated for various periods to USAF units engaged in Southeast Asia combat operations; these deployments continued until the wing inactivated on 31 March 1974.

=== Training and air base wing from 1995 ===
The 99th was redesignated the 99th Strategic Weapons Wing and activated at Ellsworth Air Force Base, South Dakota, in August 1989 as a non-flying unit. At Ellsworth, the wing conducted tactics and development evaluation and trained combat crews in strategic bombing and electronic warfare at the Strategic Training Route Complex. Redesignated the 99th Tactics and Training Wing on 1 September 1991 at Ellsworth, the wing was assigned to Strategic Air Command and later reassigned to the USAF Fighter Weapons Center on 31 May 1992 at Nellis Air Force Base, Nevada.

Major reorganizations and name changes occurred until September 1995, when the wing inactivated and was reactivated at Nellis as the 99th Air Base Wing on 1 October 1995.

A July 2009 inspection conducted by the Air Force Audit Agency found the wing had improperly stored 52 classified nuclear-related items in a 57th Aircraft Maintenance Squadron hangar. The wing has since corrected the deficiency.

== Lineage ==
99th Bombardment Group

- Constituted as the 99th Bombardment Group (Heavy) on 28 January 1942

Activated on 1 June 1942
Redesignated 99th Bombardment Group, Heavy on 29 September 1944
Inactivated on 8 November 1945
Redesignated 99th Bombardment Group, Very Heavy on 13 May 1947
Activated in the reserve on 29 May 1947
Inactivated on 27 June 1949
Consolidated with the 99th Bombardment Wing as the 99th Bombardment Wing on 31 January 1984

99th Air Base Wing

- Constituted as the 99th Strategic Reconnaissance Wing, Heavy and activated on 1 January 1953

Redesignated 99th Bombardment Wing, Heavy on 1 October 1955
Inactivated on 31 March 1974
Consolidated with the 99th Bombardment Group on 31 January 1984
Redesignated 99th Strategic Weapons Wing on 22 June 1989
Activated on 10 August 1989
Redesignated 99th Tactics and Training Wing on 1 September 1991
Redesignated 99th Wing on 15 June 1993
Redesignated 99th Air Base Wing on 1 October 1995

=== Assignments ===
- Third Air Force, 1 June 1942
- Second Air Force, c. 29 June 1942
- 5th Bombardment Wing, c. 22 February 1943
- Army Service Forces, 2–8 November 1945
- 19th Bombardment Wing, Very Heavy (later, 19 Air Division, Bombardment), 29 May 1947 – 27 June 1949
- 57th Air Division, 1 January 1953 (attached to 3d Air Division, 29 January-25 Apr 1956)
- 817th Air Division, 2 July 1969
- 45th Air Division, 30 June 1971 – 31 March 1974
- 12th Air Division, 10 August 1989
- Strategic Warfare Center, 31 July 1990
- Strategic Air Command, 1 September 1991
- USAF Fighter Weapons Center (later USAF Weapons and Tactics Center), 1 June 1992 – present

=== Stations ===
- Orlando Army Air Base, Florida, 1 June 1942
- MacDill Field, Florida, 1 June 1942
- Pendleton Field, Oregon, 29 June 1942
- Gowen Field, Idaho, 28 August 1942
- Walla Walla Army Air Field, Washington, 30 September 1942
- Sioux City Army Air Base, Iowa, 18 November 1942 – 3 January 1943
- Navarin Airfield, Algeria 22 February 1943 – 25 March 1943
- Oudna Airfield, Tunisia, 4 August 1943
- Tortorella Airfield, Italy, 11 December 1943
- Marcianise Airfield, Italy, c. 27 October – 8 November 1945
- Fairchild Air Force Base, Washington, 1 January 1953
- Westover Air Force Base, Massachusetts, 4 September 1956 – 31 March 1974
- Ellsworth Air Force Base, South Dakota, 10 August 1989 – 15 June 1993
- Nellis Air Force Base, Nevada, 1 October 1995 –

=== Components ===
Groups

- 99th Operations and Maintenance Group (later, 99th Operations Group): 1 September 1991 – 21 September 1995.
- 99th Combat Support Group: 2 January 1968 – 31 March 1974

Squadrons

- 25th Strategic Training Squadron: 10 August 1989 – 1 September 1991
- 99th Air Refueling Squadron: 1 January 1966 – 30 September 1973
- 346th Bombardment Squadron (later 346th Strategic Reconnaissance Squadron, 346th Bombardment Squadron): 1 June 1942 – 8 November 1945; 29 May 1947 – 27 June 1949; 1 January 1953 – 31 March 1974
- 347th Bombardment Squadron (later 347th Strategic Reconnaissance Squadron, 347th Bombardment Squadron): 1 June 1942 – 8 November 1945; 29 May 1947 – 27 June 1949; 1 January 1953 – 1 September 1961 (detached 1 January-12 Sep 1953 and 15–31 August 1961)
- 348th Bombardment Squadron (later 348th Strategic Reconnaissance Squadron, 348th Bombardment Squadron): 1 June 1942 – 8 November 1945; 17 July 1947 – 27 June 1949; 1 January 1953 – 30 September 1973
- 416th Bombardment Squadron: 1 June 1942 – 8 November 1945; 17 July 1947 – 27 June 1949

== See also ==
- List of B-52 Units of the United States Air Force
