= David W. Snoddy =

U.S. Air Force general

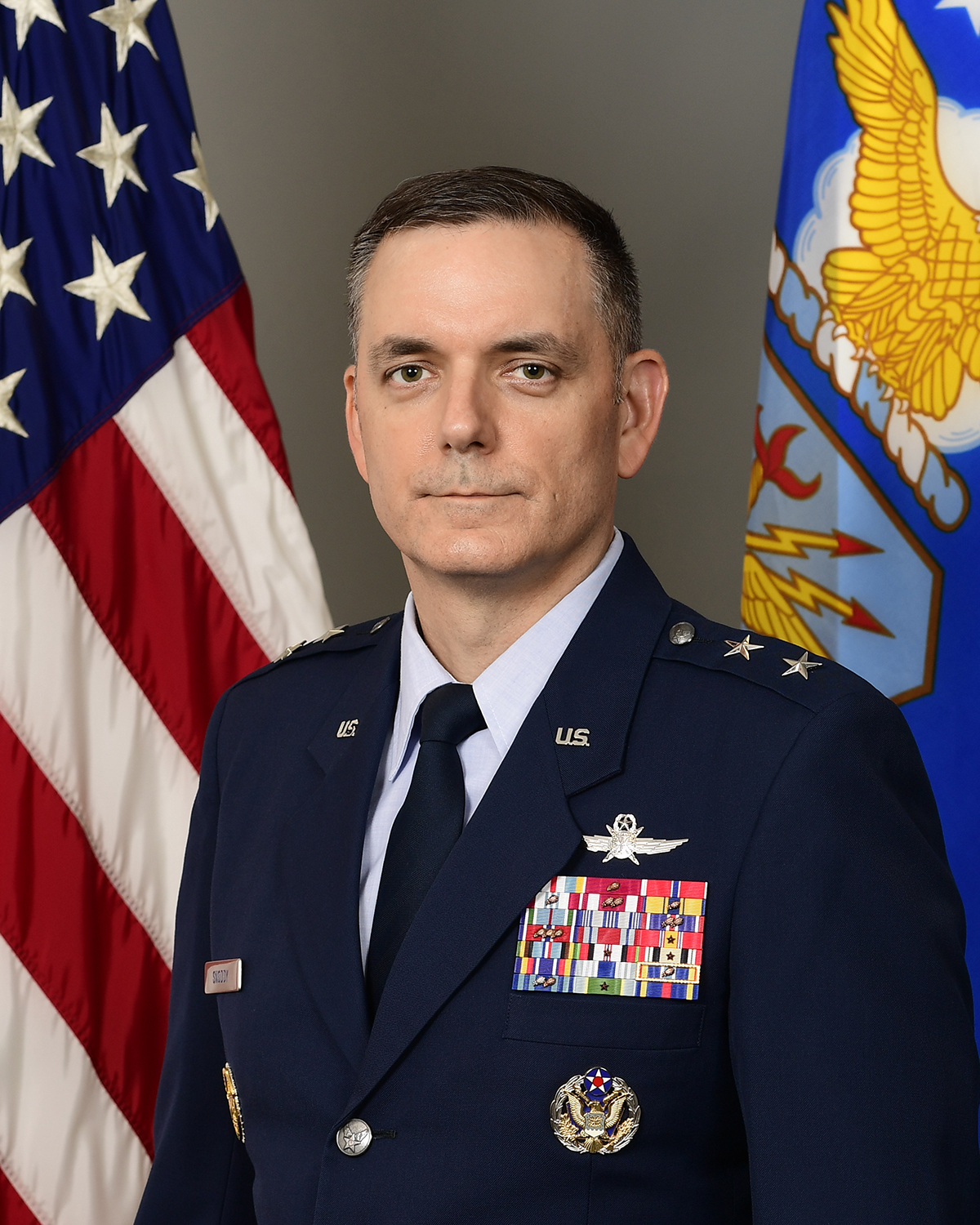
- Military career
- Allegiance: United States
- Branch: United States Air Force
- Service years: 1992–present
- Rank: Major General
- Commands: 67th Cyberspace Wing; 71st Communications Squadron
- Awards: Legion of Merit (3)

David W. Snoddy is a United States Air Force major general who has served as the assistant deputy chief of staff for cyber effects operations of the U.S. Air Force. He previously served as the deputy director for current operations of the United States Cyber Command.

== Military career ==
In 2022, Snoddy was promoted to major general and assigned as the assistant deputy chief of staff for cyber effects operations of the United States Air Force.

Military offices
Preceded by William J. Poirier	Commander of the 67th Cyberspace Wing; 2014–2016	Succeeded by Bradley L. Pyburn
Preceded by DeAnna M. Burt	Vice Commander of the United States Air Force Warfare Center; 2018–2020	Succeeded by George M. Reynolds
Preceded by ???	Deputy Director for Current Operations of the United States Cyber Command; 2020–2022	Succeeded by Ahmed T. Williamson
Preceded by Robert K. Lyman	Assistant Deputy Chief of Staff for Cyber Effects Operations of the United States Air Force; 2022–present	Incumbent
