= Angela Cadwell =

U.S. Air Force general

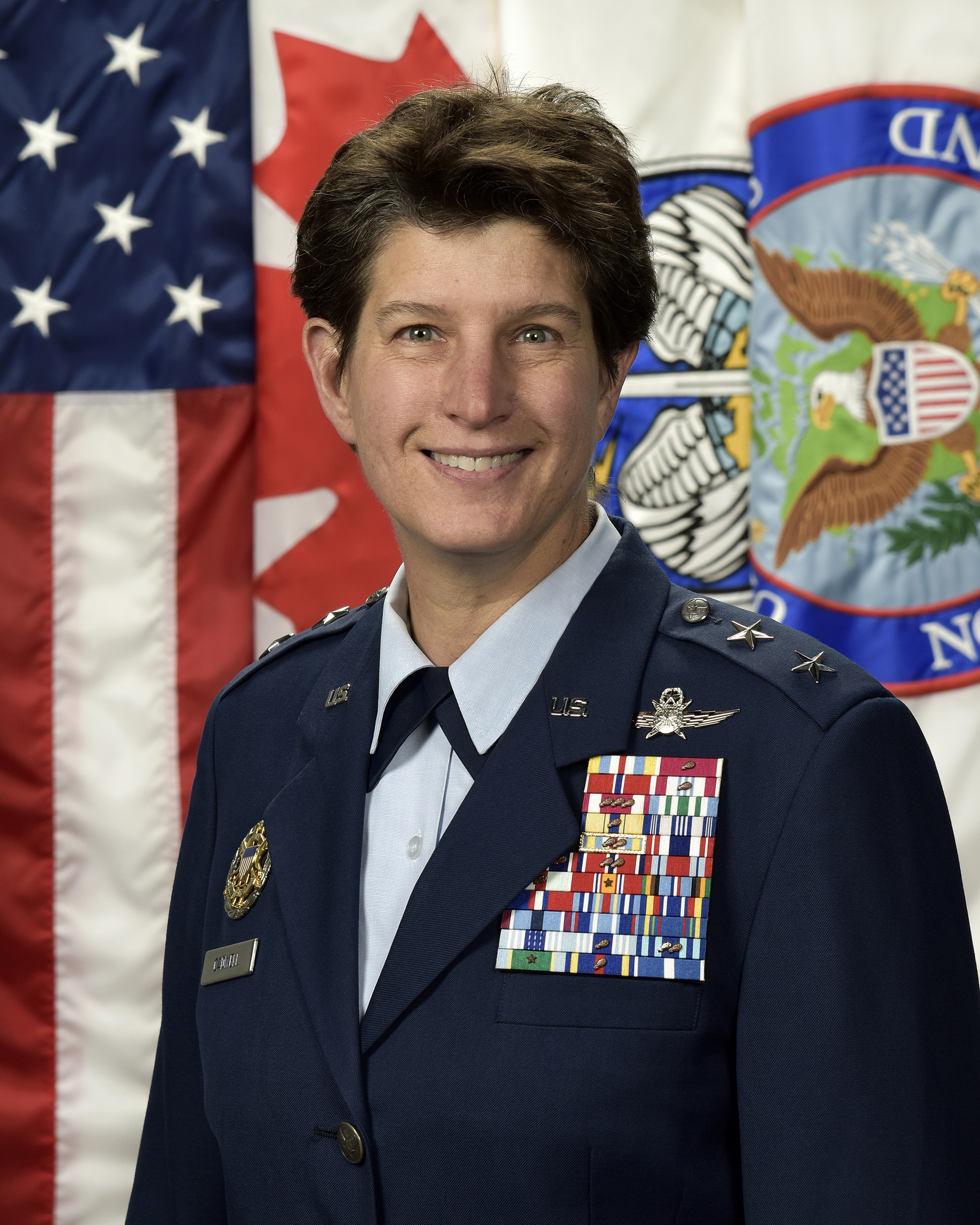
- Official portrait, 2020
- Born: Angela M. Cadwell
- Military career
- Allegiance: United States
- Branch: United States Air Force
- Service years: 1991–present
- Rank: Major general
- Commands: 501st Combat Support Wing; 47th Mission Support Group; 62nd Communications Squadron
- Awards: Defense Superior Service Medal (2); Legion of Merit (2)

Angela M. Cadwell is a retired United States Air Force major general who last served as the director for cyberspace operations of the United States Northern Command.

Military offices
Preceded by Brian T. Kelly	Commander of the 501st Combat Support Wing; 2013–2015	Succeeded by Kevin P. Cullen
Preceded by Mitchel H. Butikofer	Director for Command, Control, Communications, and Cyber Systems of the United States Transportation Command; 2016–2018	Succeeded by Robert K. Lyman
Preceded by Mark E. Weatherington	Director for Cyberspace Operations of the United States Northern Command; 2018–2021	Succeeded by Eric P. DeLange
