= Eric P. DeLange =

U.S. Air Force general

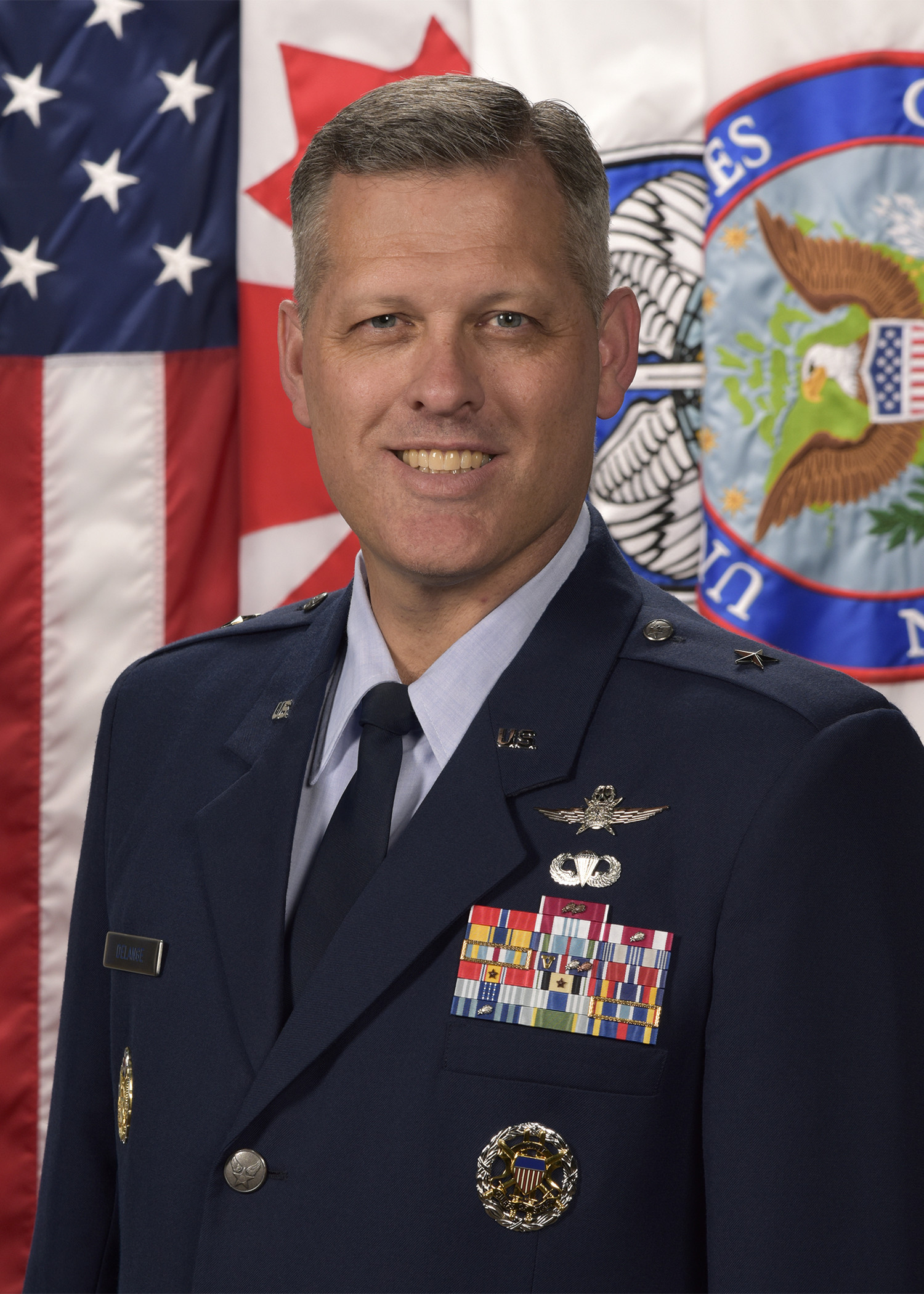
- Military career
- Allegiance: United States
- Branch: United States Air Force
- Service years: 1993–2022
- Rank: Brigadier general
- Commands: 688th Cyberspace Wing; 38th Cyberspace Engineering & Installation Group; 83rd Network Operations Squadron; 1st Air and Space Communications Operations Squadron
- Awards: Legion of Merit (3)

Eric P. DeLange is a retired United States Air Force brigadier general who last served as director for cyberspace operations of the North American Aerospace Defense Command and United States Northern Command. He previously served as the director for cyberspace operations and warfighter communications of the United States Air Force. Prior to that, he was the senior executive officer of the Vice Chief of Staff of the Air Force. In April 2021, he was assigned to become director, cyberspace operations of the U.S. Northern Command, replacing Major General Angela M. Cadwell.

Military offices
| Preceded by Michelle L. Hayworth | Commander of the 688th Cyberspace Wing; 2017–2019 | Succeeded by Steven J. Anderson |
| Preceded by Bradley L. Pyburn | Senior Executive Officer to the Vice Chief of Staff of the Air Force; 2019–2020 | Succeeded by Tad D. Clark |
| Preceded by Bradley L. Pyburn | Director of Cyberspace Operations and Warfighter Communications of the United States Air Force; 2020–2021 | Succeeded by Melissa S. Cunningham |
| Preceded by Angela Cadwell | Director for Cyberspace Operations of the North American Aerospace Defense Command and United States Northern Command; 2021–2022 | Succeeded by Robert D. Davis |
