= 25th Space Range Squadron =

U.S. Space Force range squadron

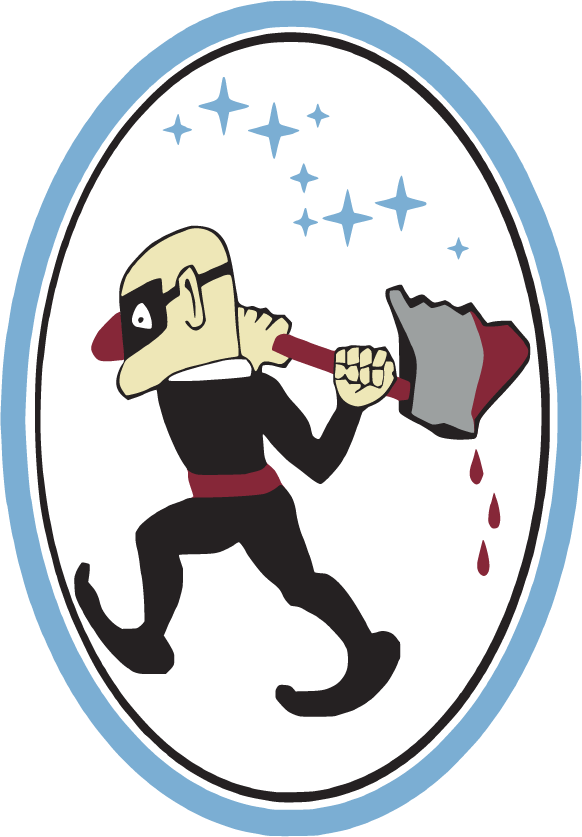
- Squadron Emblem
- Active: 1917–1919; 1921–1946; 1952–1964; 1988–1995; 2004–present
- Country: United States
- Branch: United States Space Force
- Role: Electromagnetic Range Operations
- Size: Squadron
- Part of: Space Delta 11
- Garrison/HQ: Schriever Space Force Base, Colorado
- Nickname: Executioners
- Motto: "Give 'em the axe!"
- Equipment: Space Test and Training Range
- Engagements: World War I; World War II – Antisubmarine; World War II – Asia-Pacific Theater

- Decorations: Distinguished Unit Citation (3x); Air Force Outstanding Unit Award (5x)

Commanders
- Current commander: Lt Col Mark Crimm

Insignia
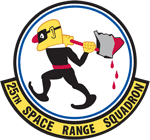
- Former 25th Space Range Squadron emblem

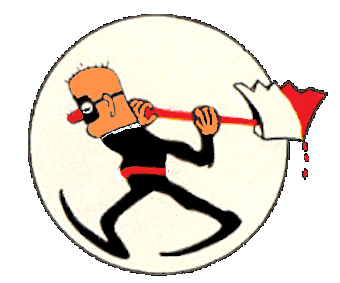
- 25th Bombardment Squadron emblem (approved 15 February 1924)

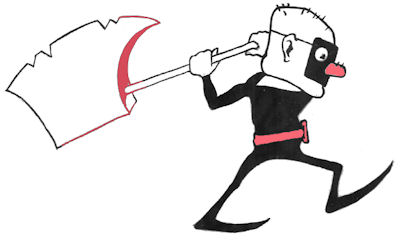
- 25th Aero Squadron emblem (approved by AEF 19 November 1918) (Note: The executioner faced left or right, so that it was facing the nose of the airplane displaying the emblem.)

The 25th Space Range Squadron is a squadron of the United States Space Force. It is assigned to the Space Delta 11 at Schriever Space Force Base, Colorado, US. The 25th operates the Space Test and Training Range along with the 379th Space Range Squadron of the United States Air Force Reserve.

The 25th is the second oldest unit in the United States Space Force, its earliest predecessor in the days of the USAAS being organized as the 20th Aero Squadron on 13 June 1917 at Camp Kelly, Texas, and due to a clerical error, redesignated as the 25th Aero Squadron by 22 June 1917. The squadron deployed to France and fought on the Western Front during World War I as a pursuit squadron within the week before the Armistice. The unit was demobilized after the war in 1919.

The squadron's second predecessor was organized as the 25th Squadron (Bombardment) in 1921 as part of the permanent United States Army Air Service. The squadron served in the Panama Canal Zone during the Inter-War period, then as part of the Twentieth Air Force in the Pacific Theater of Operations of World War II flying Boeing B-29 Superfortress bombers. During the Cold War, it was part of Strategic Air Command, equipped with Boeing B-47 Stratojet medium bombers until its inactivation in 1964.

On March 31, 2020, it was announced that the 25th Space Range Squadron would be moved to the newly formed United States Space Force. This transfer made the 25th the oldest unit in the USSF.

== Mission ==
The 25th Space Range Squadron is responsible for the operation of the Space Test and Training Range, a capability that allows units to exercise space electronic warfare capabilities in a safe, secure, and realistic environment while eliminating the risk of unintended collateral effects.

The 25th has deployed equipment and personnel to support combatant commander operations and large force exercises such as Austere Challenge.

== History ==
=== World War I ===
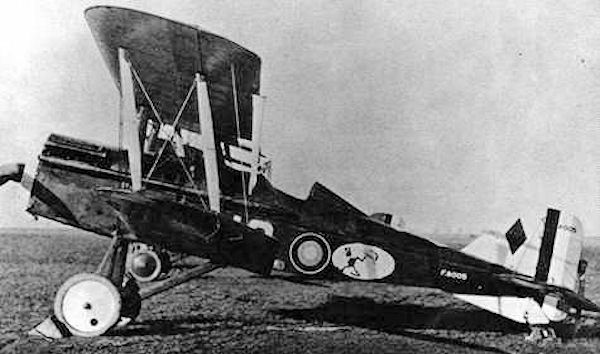
Squadron S.E.5 at Gengault Aerodrome (Toul), France, November 1918

The first predecessor of the squadron was established as the 20th Aero Squadron in June 1917 at Camp Kelly, Texas. A few days later, due to the aforementioned clerical error, it was redesignated the 25th Aero Squadron. After the United States' entry into World War I, the squadron deployed to Europe aboard RMS Carmania, first to England, then to the Western Front in France in late October 1918. it was assigned to the 4th Pursuit Group of the Second Army Air Service in the Toul Sector, but without any airplanes. The squadron finally received some British Royal Aircraft Factory S.E.5s, mostly armed with a single fuselage-mounted Vickers machine gun, and flew two missions in November 1918 days before the war ended. The first patrol was uneventful and the other patrol targeted a truck convoy in Metz with 20 lb bombs hand-dropped from their S.E. 5a aircraft. The unit returned to the United States in the spring of 1919 and was demobilized in June.

=== Defense of the Panama Canal ===
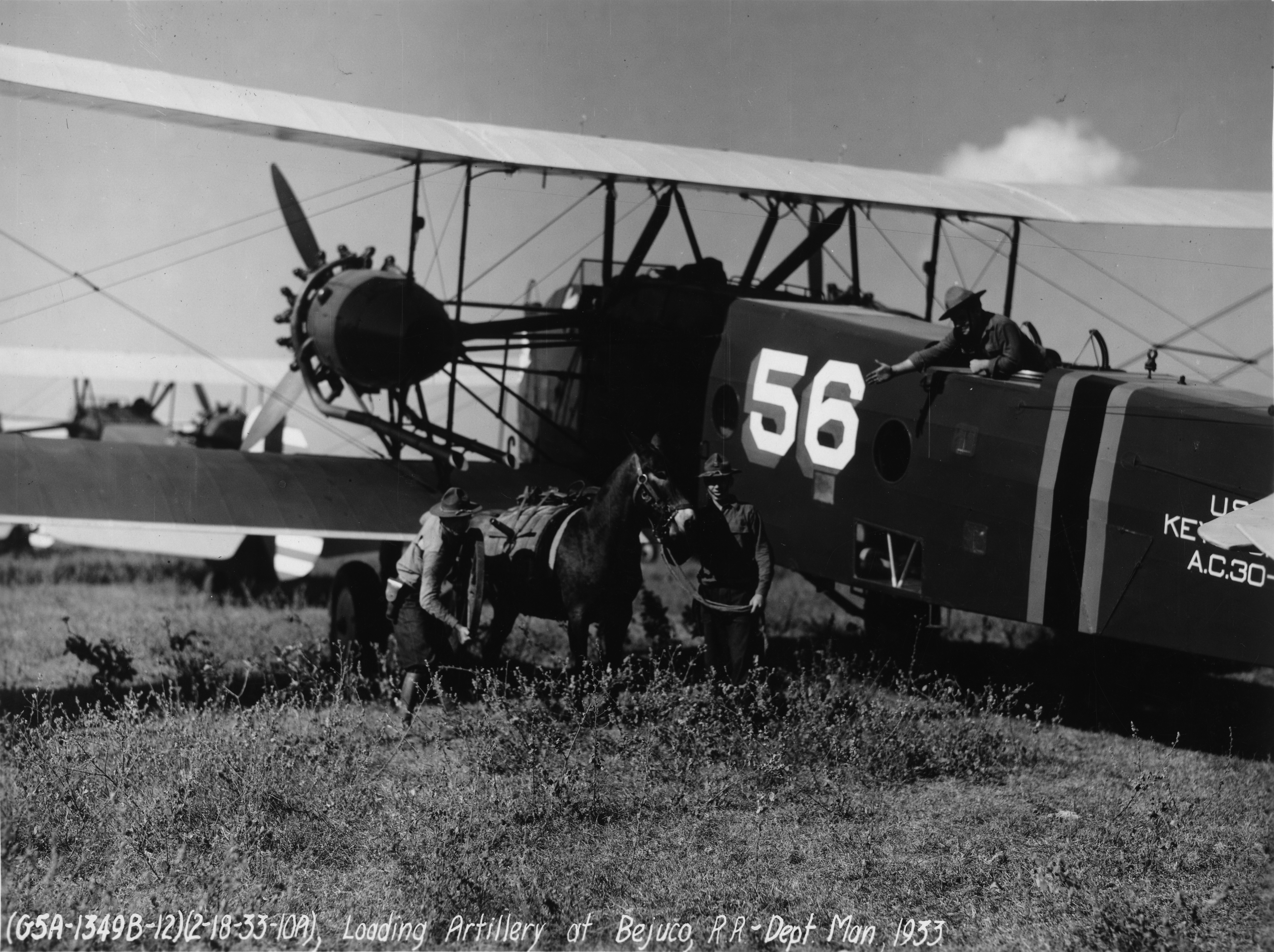
Squadron Keystone LB-6 in Panama, 1933

The 25th Squadron (Bombardment) was organized on 1 October 1921 at Mitchel Field, New York, although it is not clear whether it was equipped before moving to France Field in the Panama Canal Zone in April 1922, where the Panama Canal Department assigned it to the 6th Composite Group. It flew various biplane bombers to defend the Panama Canal. In April 1924, the squadron, now the 25th Bombardment Squadron, was consolidated with the World War I unit. During the 1920s and early 1930s, it participated in various goodwill missions in Latin America, including flights to El Salvador and Nicaragua, from 13 to 19 May 1935; to Guatemala, from 8 to 11 February 1938, and again to El Salvador, from 19 to 22 April 1938. The squadron also flew mercy mission to Chile following the devastating 1939 Chillán earthquake in January and February 1939.

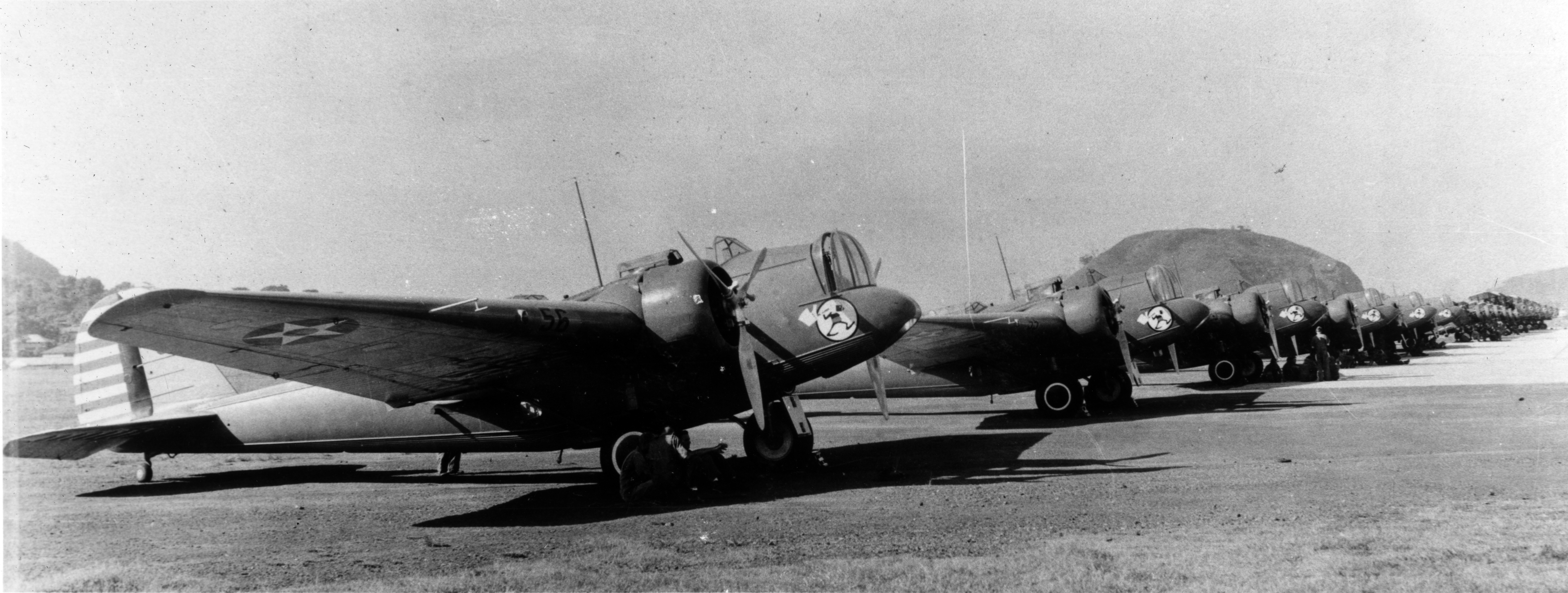
Squadron Martin B-10 in Panama, 1935–1940

The squadron equipped with Douglas B-18 Bolos and became the 25th Bombardment Squadron (Medium) on 6 December 1939 . The squadron had an opportunity to put its new, long-legged aircraft to the test in October 1939, when two Peruvian flyers, en route from the United States to Lima, Peru on a long-distance flight, were reported missing between the Canal Zone and Peru. Although eventually found to have made an emergency forced landing in Ecuador, three B-18s of the squadron conducted extensive searches of the area along the 80th meridian some 250 miles to sea. The aircraft carried enough fuel for a flight of 11 hours duration. On 20 November 1940, the unit became the 25th Bombardment Squadron (Heavy) in anticipation of the receipt of Boeing B-17E Flying Fortresses. By 25 August 1941, with its pre-war strength at but five B-18s, the Squadron was finally re-equipped with B-17E Flying Fortresses.

=== World War II ===
==== Antisubmarine campaign ====
After the attack on Pearl Harbor, the squadron left its long time home at France Field for Rio Hato Airport, Panama. Little more than a month later, it began operations from Salinas Airfield, Ecuador and the Galapagos Islands (shuttling patrols back and forth) with four of the B-17Es, flying antisubmarine patrols over the Pacific approaches to the Panama Canal. These aircraft being joined by a B-18 by February. The main body of the Squadron left Salinas by 15 February and returned to Howard Field in early 1943, although a detachment was still in Ecuador as late as 30 June.

On 12 May 1943, the squadron was transferred to the 40th Bombardment Group and, the following month, the main body of the squadron, which had been at Howard Field only briefly in the spring of 1943, ended its 21 years of service in the Canal Zone, and moved to the United States.

==== Strategic attacks on Japan ====
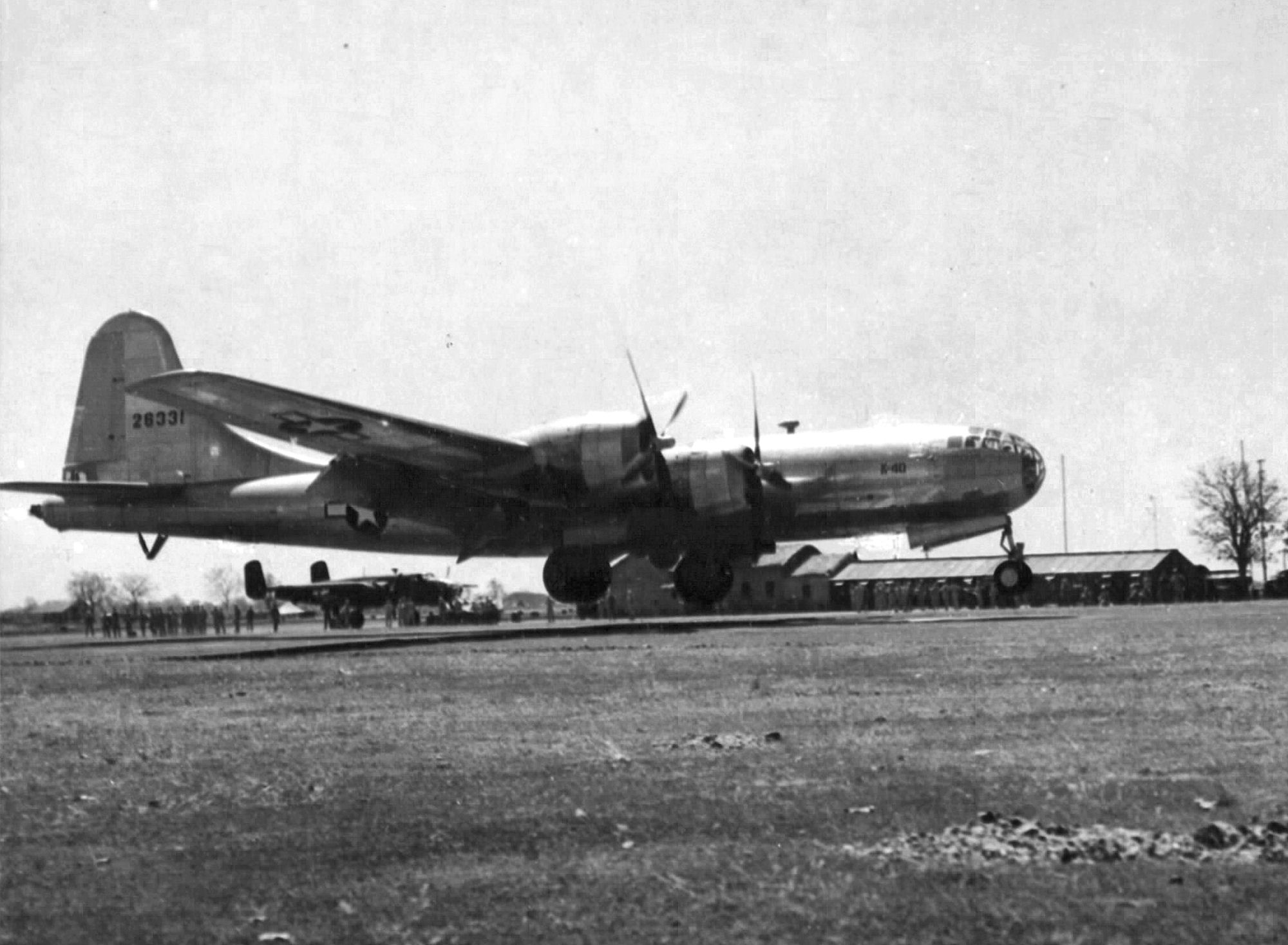
Squadron B-29 Superfortress at Chakulia Airfield, India (Note: Aircraft is Boeing B-29-10-BW Superfortress, serial 42-6331. This aircraft was the first B-29 to reach the CBI Theatre of Operations. Photo taken in July 1944, showing aircraft taking off to attack Japanese targets during the Battle of Imphal. The aircraft was lost in combat, 1 December 1944.)

The 25th was stationed at Pratt Army Air Field, Kansas in July 1943 and remanned with new personnel. It received prototype and early production-model Boeing B-29 Superfortress very heavy bombers. It trained under Second Air Force for an extended period due to Boeing technicians making modifications to its B-29 aircraft. It deployed with the new XX Bomber Command as part of the 58th Bombardment Wing to the China-Burma-India Theater, flying to bases in India via South Atlantic ferrying route; across central Africa and Arabia to Karachi. Additional modifications to its B-29s were necessary in India to accommodate very high ground temperatures of 115 °F (46 °C).

From airfields in eastern India, engaged in very long range bombardment raids on Japan. The squadron participated in the first American Air Force attack on the Japanese Home Islands since the 1942 Doolittle Raid on 15/16 June 1944, attacking the Imperial Iron and Steel Works at Yawata on Kyushu by using its forward staging base at Hsinching Airfield (A-1), China, for refueling. It performed a total of nine missions to Japan, also engaged in very long range attacks against enemy targets in Thailand, Manchuria, Borneo, Formosa, Burma, Malaya, Japanese-occupied China, Singapore, Saigon and Cam Rahn Bay, French Indochina. It also engaged in aerial mining of Japanese-occupied seaports in Thailand, Malaya and French Indochina.

The advance of American forces in the Central Pacific though the Northern Mariana Islands made new airfields available within the effective bombing range of Japan. It moved to West Field (Tinian) in April 1945, becoming part of the new XXI Bomber Command. From the Marianas, it engaged in very long range strategic attacks on Japan, its first mission being on 5 May 1945 against the Hiro Naval Aircraft Factory in Kure. Air attacks over Japan were initially high-altitude daylight bombing missions against industrial, transportation and military targets, largely ineffective due to high upper-level winds dispersing bombs over a wide area. By July, began low-level large area night incendiary raids on urban areas, and dropped mines in Japanese shipping lanes. Continued aerial assaults until the Japanese Capitulation in August 1945, final combat mission taking place on 9/10 August attacking the Hikari Naval Arsenal.

After V-J Day, the squadron dropped food and supplies to Allied prisoners in Japan, Korea, and Formosa, and took part in show-of-force missions. The squadron returned to the United States in November 1945 and was inactivated at Davis-Monthan Field, Arizona in the fall of 1946.

=== Strategic bombardment ===
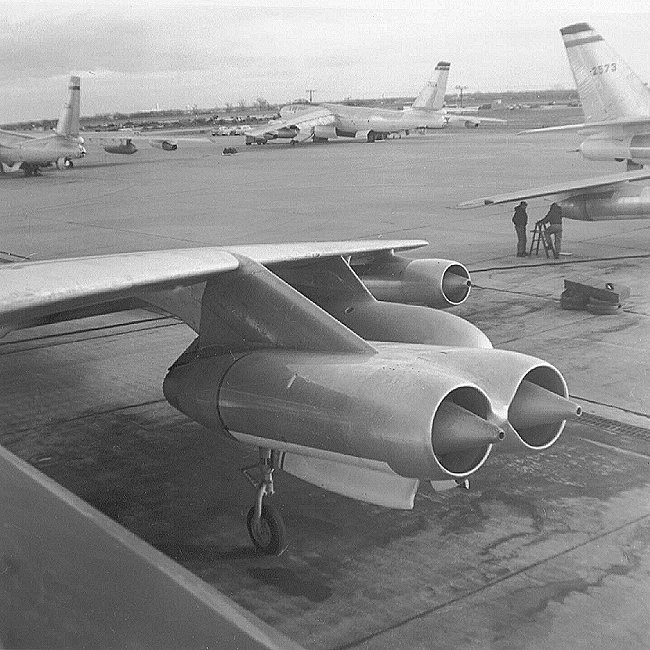
Squadron B-47s on Smoky Hill AFB flight line in 1956

The squadron was reactivated at Smoky Hill Air Force Base, Kansasin 1952 as Strategic Air Command expanded its bomber force. The 25th initially received what were by then second-line B-29s for training and organization. The propeller-driven B-29s were replaced with new Boeing B-47E Stratojet swept-wing medium bombers in 1954, capable of flying at high subsonic speeds and primarily designed for penetrating the airspace of the Soviet Union. In the 1960s, the B-47 was considered to be reaching obsolescence and was being phased out of SAC's strategic arsenal. The 25th began sending aircraft to other B-47 wings as replacements in early 1964 and was one of the last SAC squadrons equipped with the Stratojet. The squadron inactivated in September 1964 when the last B-47 aircraft was retired from SAC.

=== Strategic tactics development and range control ===
The 25th was reactivated in 1988 as a SAC training squadron. From 1988 to 1992, the 25th supervised SAC Boeing B-52H Stratofortress bomber crew training and, from 1992 to 1995, Air Combat Command B-52H and then Rockwell B-1 Lancer bomber crew training at Ellsworth Air Force Base, South Dakota. The squadron provided range control and tactics development via the Strategic Training Route Complex from its Strategic Weapons Center facility. It inactivated again in 1995.

=== Space tactics development and range control ===
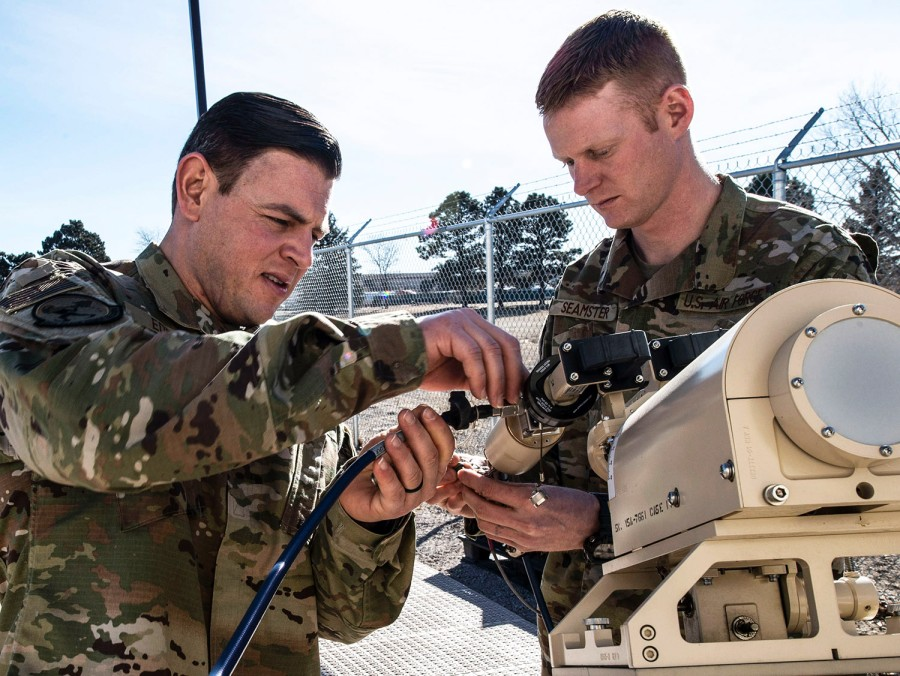
25th maintainers change a feed on a ground terminal antenna. Colorado Springs, CO January 24, 2020

A requirement for a safe and secure space range mission was conceived by Air Force Space Command in 2001. Connecting to its strategic training range and tactics development lineage, the 25th was reactivated at Schriever Air Force Base, Colorado as the 25th Space Control Tactics Squadron, on 1 July 2004.

In November 2007, the Executioners were redesignated at as the 25th Space Range Squadron and later tested new space control tactics in a secure environment.

Air Force Reserve Command activated the 379th Space Range Squadron in April 2012 as an associate unit, joining the 25th in its range management function.

In 2013, the 25th was transferred back to Air Combat Command and moved under the Nevada Test and Training Range of the United States Air Force Warfare Center.

On 21 June 2017, the 25th celebrated its "Centennial Anniversary" and became one of the first Air Force units to trace its lineage over 100 years.

On 24 July 2020 the 25th Space Range Squadron was transferred to the United States Space Force and assigned to the Space Training and Readiness Delta Provisional.

On 23 August 2021, Space Training and Readiness Command was activated and on 30 August Space Delta 11 held an activation ceremony, officially aligning all Space Force range and aggressor units under a single command, including the 25th.

== Lineage ==
=== Organization ===
- Organized as the 20th Aero Squadron On 13 June 1917

Redesignated 25th Aero Squadron on 22 June 1917
Demobilized on 17 June 1919

- Reconstituted and consolidated with the 25th Bombardment Squadron as the 25th Bombardment Squadron on 8 April 1924

25th Space Range Squadron

- Authorized as the 25th Squadron (Bombardment) on 30 August 1921
- Organized on 1 October 1921

Redesignated 25th Bombardment Squadron on 25 January 1923

- Consolidated with the 25th Aero Squadron on 8 April 1924

Redesignated 25th Bombardment Squadron (Medium) on 6 December 1939
Redesignated 25th Bombardment Squadron (Heavy) on 20 November 1940
Redesignated 25th Bombardment Squadron, Very Heavy on 20 November 1943
Inactivated on 1 October 1946

- Redesignated: 25th Bombardment Squadron, Medium on 9 May 1952

Activated on 28 May 1952
Discontinued and inactivated on 1 September 1964

- Redesignated 25th Strategic Training Squadron on 21 June 1988

Activated on 1 July 1988
Redesignated 25th Flying Tactics Training Squadron on 1 September 1991
Redesignated 25th Training Squadron on 15 June 1993
Inactivated on 21 September 1995

- Redesignated 25th Space Control Tactics Squadron on 20 April 2004

Activated on 1 July 2004
Redesignated: 25th Space Range Squadron on 11 November 2007

=== Assignments ===
- Post Headquarters, Kelly Field, 13 June 1917
- Aviation Concentration Center, 3 January 1918
- Air Service Headquarters, AEF, British Isles

Attached to the Royal Flying Corps for training, 31 January-16 August 1918

- Replacement Concentration Center, AEF, 18 August 1918
- Air Service Production Center No. 2, 29 August 1918
- 1st Air Depot, 16 September 1918
- 4th Pursuit Group, November 1918
- 1st Air Depot, 15 April 1919
- Commanding General, Services of Supply, April 1919
- Post Headquarters, Mitchell Field, June 1919
- Second Corps Area, 1 October 1921
- Panama Canal Department, 30 April 1922
- 6th Group (Observation) (later 6th Group (Composite), 6th Composite Group, 6th Bombardment Group), 27 May 1922
- 40th Bombardment Group, 12 May 1943 – 1 October 1946
- 40th Bombardment Wing (later 40th Strategic Aerospace Wing), 28 May 1952 – 1 September 1964
- Strategic Air Command, 1 July 1988
- 99th Strategic Weapons Wing, 10 August 1989

99th Operations and Maintenance Group (later 99th Operations Group), 1 September 1991 – 21 September 1995

- 595th Space Group, 1 July 2004
- Nevada Test and Training Range, 1 April 2013 – 30 Jun 2020
- Space Training and Readiness Delta Provisional, 30 Jun 2020 – present

=== Stations ===
- Camp Kelly (later Kelly Field), Texas, 13 June–28 December 1917
- Aviation Concentration Center, Garden City, New York, 3 January 1918
- Port of Entry, Hoboken, New Jersey, 9 January 1918
- Liverpool, England, 24 January 1918
- Romsey Rest Camp, Winchester, England, 25 January 1918
- RFC Ayr, Scotland, 31 January 1918
- Marske-by-the-Sea, England, 23 April 1918 – 7 August 1918
- Romsey Rest Camp, Winchester, England, 7 August 1918
- Rest Camp No. 4, Le Havre, France, 16 August 1918
- St. Maixent Replacement Barracks, France, 20 August 1918
- Romorantin Aerodrome, France, 29 August 1918
- Colombey-les-Belles Airdrome, France, 18 September 1918
- Gengault Aerodrome, Toul, France, 24 October 1918
- Colombey-les-Belles Airdrome, France, 15 April 1919
- Le Mans, France, 5–19 May 1919
- Mitchell Field, New York, 6–17 June 1919
- Mitchell Field, New York, 1 October 1921 – 22 April 1922
- France Field, Panama Canal Zone, 30 April 1922
- Rio Hato Airport, Panama, 8 December 1941
- Salinas Airfield, Ecuador, c. 21 January 1942
- Howard Field, Panama Canal Zone, 22 May–16 June 1943
- Pratt Army Air Field, Kansas, 1 July 1943 – 12 March 1944
- Chakulia Airfield, India, C. 11 April 1944 – April 1945
- West Field (Tinian), Tinian, April-7 November 1945
- March Field, California, 27 November 1945
- Davis-Monthan Field, Arizona, c. 8 May-1 October 1946
- Smoky Hill Air Force Base (later Schilling Air Force Base), Kansas, 28 May 1952 (deployed at RAF Lakenheath, June–September 1955 and RAF Greenham Common, England, July–October 1957)
- Forbes Air Force Base, Kansas, 20 June 1960 – 1 September 1964
- Ellsworth Air Force Base, South Dakota, 1 July 1988 – 21 September 1995
- Schriever Space Force Base, Colorado, 1 July 2004 – present

=== Aircraft ===
- Royal Aircraft Factory S.E.5, 1918–1919
- Unknown, 1921–1922
- Included Martin NBS-1 during period 1922–1929
- Included Keystone LB-5 and LB-7 during period 1928–1932
- Keystone B-3A, 1931–1936
- Keystone B-6, 1936–1937
- Martin B-10, 1937–1939
- Douglas B-18 Bolo, 1938–1942
- B-24 Liberator, 1942–1943
- LB-30 1942–1943
- Martin B-26 Marauder, 1943
- Boeing B-17 Flying Fortress, 1943–1944
- Boeing YB-29 Superfortress, 1943–1944
- Boeing B-29 Superfortress, 1944–1946, 1953–1954
- Boeing B-47 Stratojet, 1954–1964
- Boeing B-52 Stratofortress, 1988–1993
- Rockwell B-1 Lancer, 1993–1995

=== Space Systems ===
- Deployable Signal Monitoring Unit (D-SMU), 2003 – present
- Fixed Signal Monitoring Unit (F-SMU), 2013-2023
- Range Closed Loop Environment (RCLE), 2011 – present
- Transportable Range Operations Center (TROC), 2024-present
* AN/TSC-179 Ground Multi-band Terminal (GMT) with 2.4m antenna and 3.9m URC-119 Quad-band Large Aperture Antenna (QLAA)

=== Notable personnel ===
- Reed G. Landis, formerly flew with No. 40 Squadron RAF accredited with 12 aerial victories
- Frederick Ernest Luff, accredited with 5 aerial victories, DFC recipient
- Eugene Hoy Barksdale, accredited with 6 aerial victories, DSC recipient, Barksdale AFB named in his honor
- Joseph Elwood "Shorty/Child Yank" Boudwin Jr., also a No. 84 Squadron RAF veteran. The Warren J. Brown-authored history book "Child Yank over the Rainbow" is based on his diary.
- John E. Shaw First Director of Operations for the 25th Space Control Tactics Squadron and Commander of the Space Operations Command (SpOC) for the United States Space Force.

== List of commanders ==
- Lt Col Donald Ridolfi, 2004-2006
- Lt Col Chris Moss, 2006-2008
- Lt Col Robert Ramsden, 2008-2010
- Lt Col Todd Spradley, June 2010 - June 2012
- Lt Col Blake Jeffries, June 2012 – June 2014
- Lt Col John Thien, June 2014 – July 2016
- Lt Col Anthony Zilinsky, July 2016 – June 2018
- Lt Col Jason Powell, 2018 – 2020
- Lt Col David Washer, 2020 – 2022
- Lt Col Gerrit Dalman, 16 June 2022 – 25 June 2024
- Lt Col Mark Crimm, 25 June 2024 – present

== See also ==
- List of B-29 Superfortress operators
- List of B-47 units of the United States Air Force
- Space Test and Training Range
