= Strategic Training Route Complex =

The Strategic Training Route Complex is a series of training routes operated by the United States Strategic Command where bomber aircraft are able to train using tactics for low-level flight. During the Cold War, fourteen routes were operated by the 99th Strategic Weapons Wing. Range control was provided by the 25th Strategic Training Squadron (now known as the 25th Space Range Squadron). The current routes are located in Wyoming, South Dakota, North Dakota, and Montana. One downside to the routes being out west, is that it made it prohibitive for units in the Eastern United States to travel west without expending flight hours.

== See also ==
- 99th Tactics and Training Wing
- 25th Space Range Squadron
