= Naval Air Systems Command =

Naval Aviation Material Systems Command of the U.S. Navy

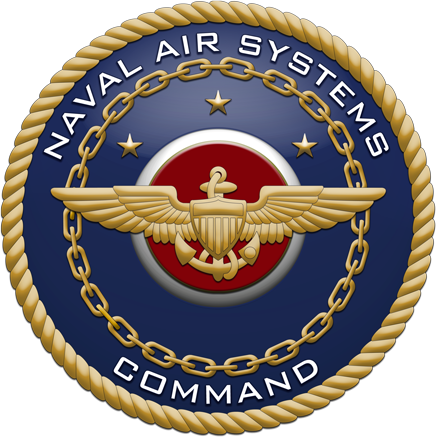
- Seal of the Naval Air Systems Command
- Founded: 1966; 60 years ago
- Country: United States
- Branch: United States Navy
- Type: SYSCOM
- Role: Naval warfare, Naval Aviation
- Part of: SYSCOM
- Headquarters: Naval Air Station Patuxent River; Patuxent River, Maryland, U.S.
- Website: www.navair.navy.mil

Commanders
- Commander: Vice Admiral John E. Dougherty IV
- Vice Commander: Captain Eric M. Gardner
- Deputy Commander: Thomas G. Rudowsky
- Command Master Chief: CMDCM James W. Stedding

The Naval Air Systems Command (NAVAIR) provides materiel support for aeronaval aircraft and airborne weapon systems for the United States Navy. It is one of the Echelon II Navy systems commands (SYSCOM), and was established in 1966 as the successor to the Navy's Bureau of Naval Weapons.

NAVAIR is headquartered in Naval Air Station Patuxent River in St. Mary's County, Maryland, with military and civilian personnel stationed at eight locations across the continental United States and one site overseas. The current commander as of August 2025 is Vice Admiral John E. Dougherty IV, USN. The vice commander is Captain Eric M. Gardner, USN. The deputy commander is Mr. Thomas G. Rudowsky, SES. The Command Master Chief is CMDCM James W. Stedding, USN.

NAVAIR's mission is to provide full life-cycle support of naval aviation aircraft, weapons and systems operated by Sailors and Marines. This support includes research, design, development and systems engineering, acquisition, test and evaluation, training facilities and equipment, repair and modification, and in-service engineering and logistics support.

NAVAIR is organized into eight "competencies" or communities of practice namely: program management, contracts, research and engineering, test and evaluation, logistics and industrial operations, corporate operations, comptroller and counsel.

The competency alignment of the organization is changing to "mission alignment."

NAVAIR provides support (through people, processes, tools, training, mission facilities, and core technologies) to Naval Aviation Program Executive Officers (PEOs) and their assigned program managers, who are responsible for meeting the cost, schedule, and performance requirements of their assigned programs.

== Headquarters Groups ==
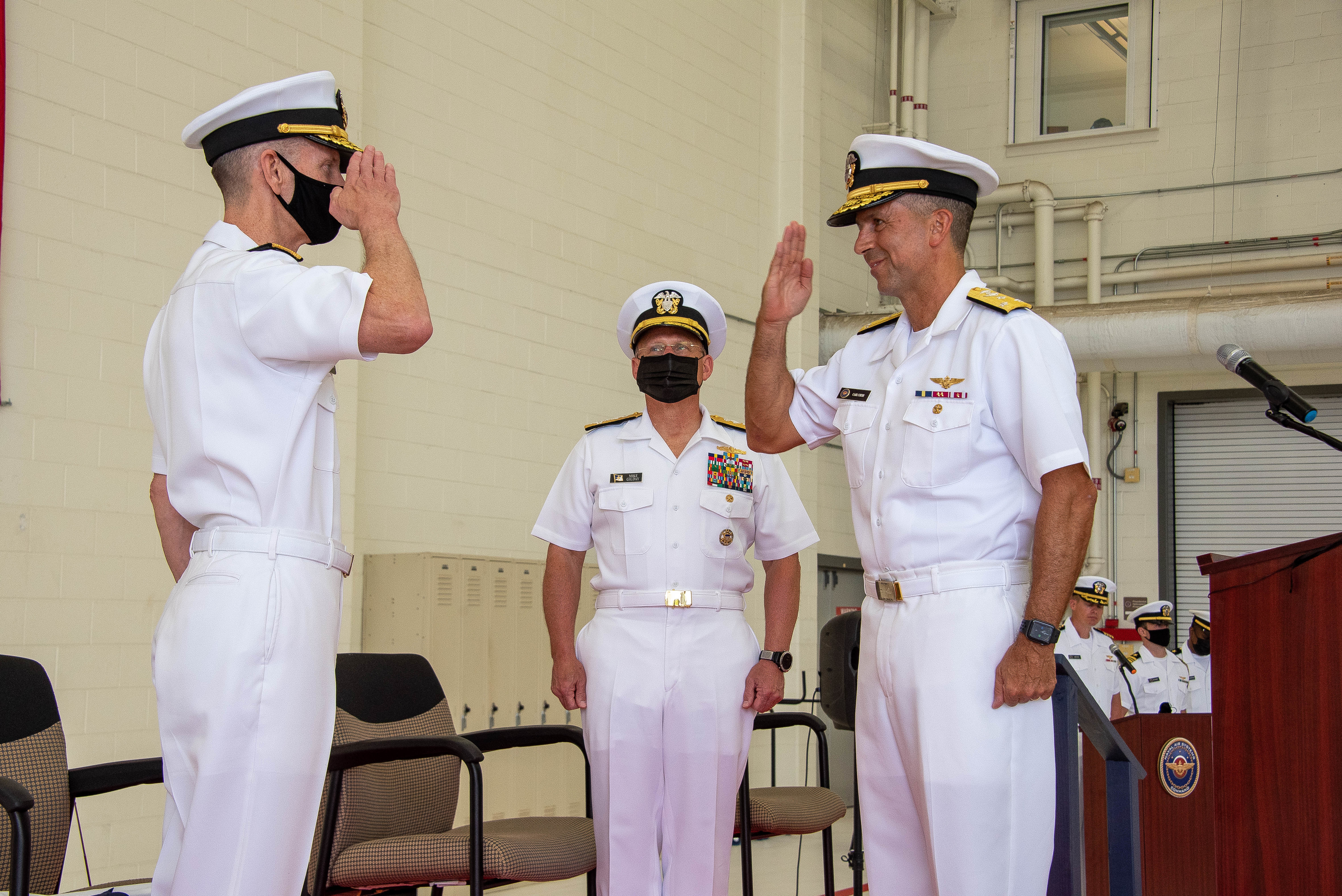
After reading his orders from the podium, Vice Admiral Carl Chebi, right, salutes Vice Admiral G. Dean Peters and assumes duties as Commander, Naval Air Systems Command on September 9, 2021, at Naval Air Station Patuxent River, Maryland.

NAVAIR encompasses six headquarters groups that report directly to the Commander, Naval Air Systems Command:

- Sustainment
- Procurement
- Engineering & Cyber Warfare
- Command Operations
- Comptroller
- Office of General Counsel

== Commands ==
NAVAIR is organized into three Echelon III commands:

=== Naval Air Warfare Center Aircraft Division ===
- Naval Air Warfare Center Aircraft Division (NAWCAD) is the naval air center for Aircraft Systems Development and Testing. NAWCAD is located at the Naval Air Engineering Station Lakehurst and the Naval Air Station Patuxent River.
  - Naval Air Warfare Center Training Systems Division (NAWCTSD) is the naval air center for the development of simulation-based training systems. NAWCTSD is an Echelon IV command that reports to the Commander, Naval Air Warfare Center Aircraft Division (COMNAWCAD) and is located in Orlando, Florida.
  - Naval Test Wing Atlantic (NTWL) comprises the United States Naval Test Pilot School and four test and evaluation squadrons.

=== Naval Air Warfare Center Weapons Division ===
- Naval Air Warfare Center Weapons Division (NAWCWD) is the naval air center for Weapons Systems and Energetics Development and Testing. NAWCWD is located at the Naval Air Weapons Station China Lake and the Naval Air Station Point Mugu.
  - Naval Test Wing Pacific (NTWP) comprises a test and evaluation squadron and a range support squadron.

=== Commander, Fleet Readiness Centers (COMFRC) ===
Fleet Readiness Centers are support activities that provide shore-based and depot level maintenance and support to the Navy's aviation effort. They are under the direction of the office of Commander, Fleet Readiness Centers (COMFRC).

Below are the following Fleet Readiness Centers:

- Fleet Readiness Center East, Marine Corps Air Station Cherry Point
- Fleet Readiness Center Mid-Atlantic, Naval Air Station Oceana
- Fleet Readiness Center Northwest, Naval Air Station Whidbey Island
- Fleet Readiness Center Southeast, Naval Air Station Jacksonville
- Fleet Readiness Center Southwest, Naval Air Station North Island
- Fleet Readiness Center West, Naval Air Station Lemoore
- Fleet Readiness Center Western Pacific, Naval Air Facility Atsugi, Japan
- FRC Aviation Support Equipment (ASE), Solomons Island, Maryland
- FRC Reserve, Naval Air Station Patuxent River

== Program Executive Offices (PEOs) ==
The Naval Air Systems Command Program Executive Offices (PEOs) are organizations responsible for the prototyping, procurement, and fielding of naval air equipment. Their mission is to develop, acquire, field and sustain affordable and integrated state of the art equipment for the Navy.

The Naval Air Systems Command is organizationally aligned to the Chief of Naval Operations. As part of its mission, NAVAIR provides support, manpower, resources, and facilities to its aligned Program Executive Offices (PEOs). The Program Executive Offices are responsible for the execution of major defense acquisition programs. The PEOs are organizationally aligned to the Assistant Secretary of the Navy for Research, Development and Acquisition (ASN(RDA)). The Naval Aviation PEOs are co-located with the Naval Air Systems Command at the Naval Air Station Patuxent River, MD, and operate under NAVAIR policies and procedures.

There are five Naval Air Systems Program Executive Offices.

- Program Executive Office, Air Anti-Submarine Warfare, Assault & Special Mission (PEO(A))
- Program Executive Office, Aviation Common Systems and Commercial Services (PEO(CS))
- Program Executive Office, Tactical Aircraft Programs (PEO(T))
- Program Executive Office, Unmanned Aviation and Strike Weapons (PEO(U&W))
- Program Executive Office, F-35 Lightning II (PEO(F-35))

=== Products areas ===
NAVAIR operations can also be subdivided into five product areas:

- Fixed Wing
- Rotorcraft
- Weapons
- Unmanned
- Aviation Systems

== Naval Aviation Enterprise ==
NAVAIR is part of the Naval Aviation Enterprise triad model currently headed by the Commander, Naval Air Forces (CNAF) and supported by the OPNAV Director, Naval Air Warfare.

== See also ==
U.S. Armed Forces systems commands

- Army Materiel Command
- Marine Corps Systems Command
- United States Navy systems commands
  - Naval Sea Systems Command
  - Naval Information Warfare Systems Command
  - Naval Facilities Engineering Systems Command
  - Naval Supply Systems Command
- Air Force Materiel Command
- Space Systems Command
