= Shaun Morris =

U.S. Air Force Lieutenant general

Shaun Q. Morris
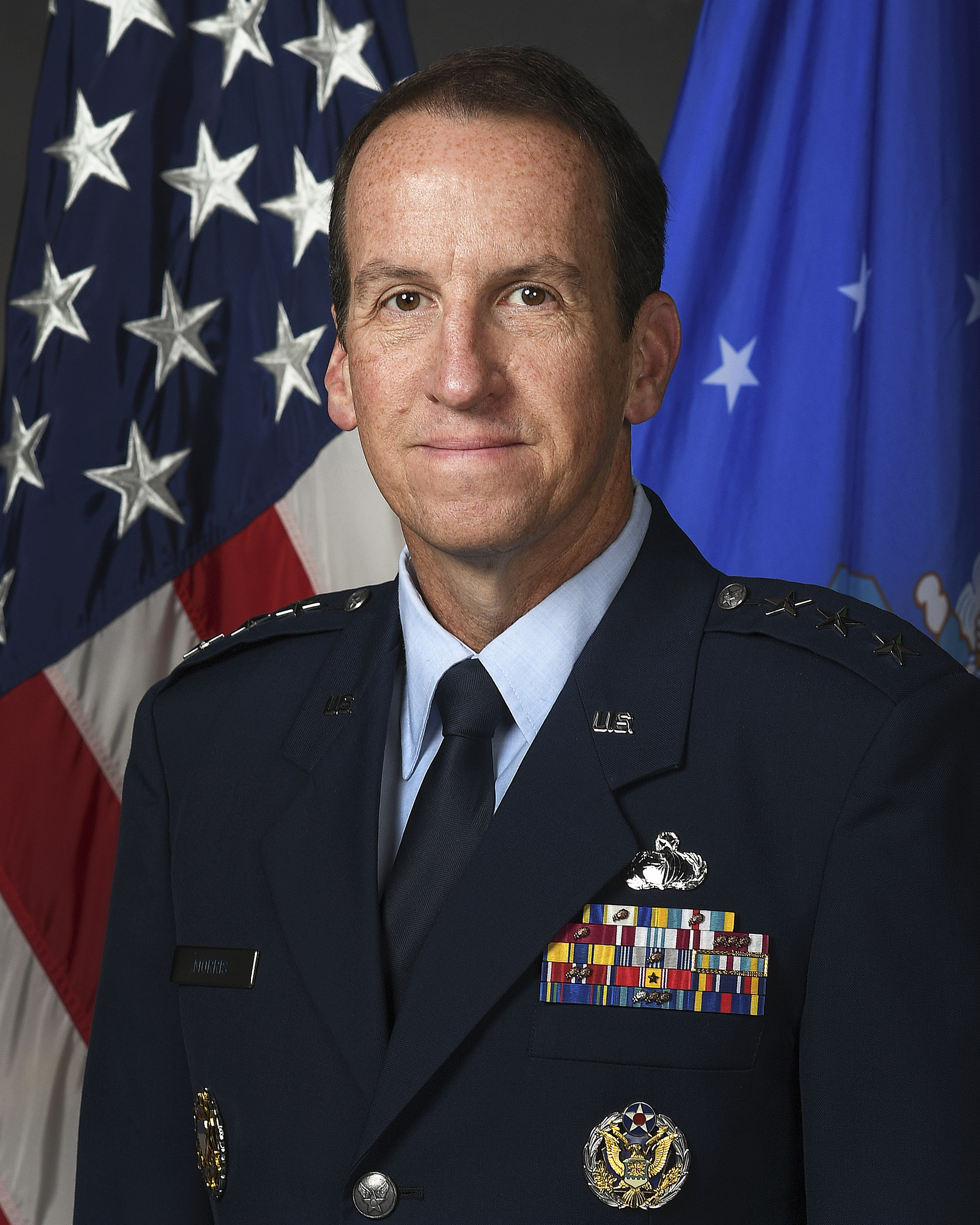
- Military career
- Allegiance: United States
- Branch: United States Air Force
- Service years: 1988–2023
- Rank: Lieutenant General
- Commands: Air Force Life Cycle Management Center; Air Force Nuclear Weapons Center; Defense Contract Management Agency – Middle East
- Awards: Air Force Distinguished Service Medal (2); Defense Superior Service Medal (2); Legion of Merit (2)

Shaun Q. Morris is a retired United States Air Force lieutenant general who last served as the commander of the Air Force Life Cycle Management Center from 2020 to 2023. Previously, he was the commander of the Air Force Nuclear Weapons Center.

== Effective dates of promotions ==
Rank	Date
Second Lieutenant	June 1, 1988
First Lieutenant	June 1, 1990
Captain	June 1, 1992
Major	July 1, 1999
Lieutenant Colonel	March 1, 2003
Colonel	July 1, 2008
Brigadier General	January 17, 2014
Major General	October 2, 2017
Lieutenant General	September 3, 2020

Military offices
Preceded by Scott Jansson	Director, Armament Directorate of the Air Force Life Cycle Management Center; 2015–2017	Succeeded by Anthony Genatempo
Preceded by Scott Jansson	Commander of the Air Force Nuclear Weapons Center; 2017–2020	Succeeded by Anthony Genatempo
Preceded by Robert McMurry	Commander of the Air Force Life Cycle Management Center; 2020–2023	Succeeded by Dennis L. D'Angelo; Acting
