= Gregory Masiello =

U.S. Marine Corps general

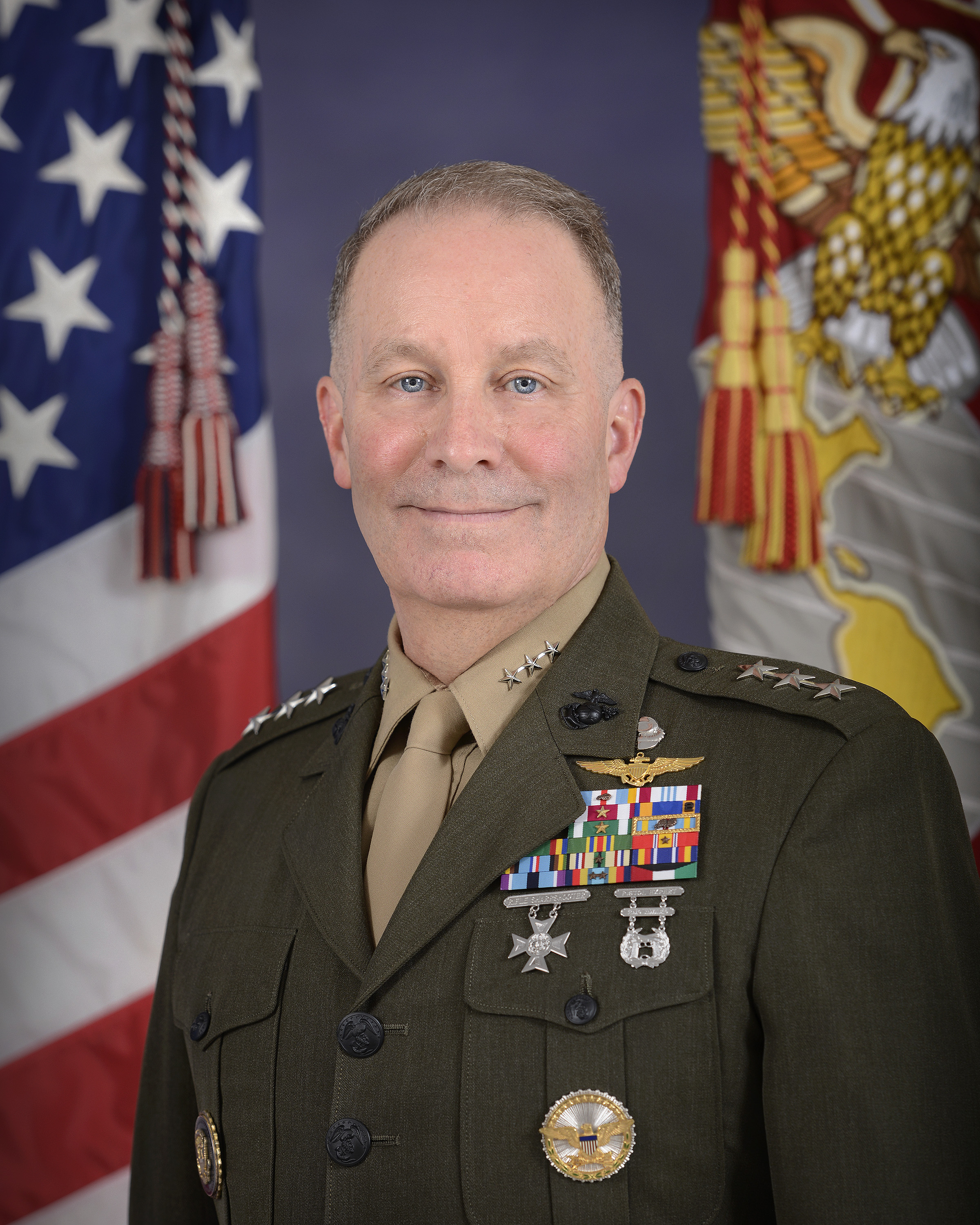
- Official portrait, 2023
- Born: Linthicum, Maryland
- Military career
- Allegiance: United States
- Branch: United States Marine Corps
- Service years: 1987–present
- Rank: Lieutenant General
- Commands: F-35 Lightning II Joint Program Office; Defense Contract Management Agency

Gregory L. Masiello is a United States Marine Corps lieutenant general who has served as the program executive officer of the F-35 Lightning II Program Office since 17 July 2025. He most recently served as director of the Defense Contract Management Agency from 2023 to 2025. He previously served as the military deputy to the under secretary of defense for policy, and as the program executive officer for Air Anti-Submarine Warfare, Assault, and Special Mission of the Naval Air Systems Command from 2018 to 2022.

In March 2023, Masiello was nominated for promotion to lieutenant general and assignment as director of the Defense Contract Management Agency. In June 2025, Masiello was nominated for reappointment as a lieutenant general and assignment as program executive officer for the F-35 Lightning II Joint Program Office.

== Early life and education ==
Masiello was inducted into the United States Naval Academy on July 6, 1983, and graduated with the class of 1987 on May 20, 1987.

Military offices
Preceded by G. Dean Peters	Program Executive Officer for Air Anti-Submarine Warfare, Assault, and Special Mission of the United States Navy; 2018–2022	Succeeded by Gary M. Kurtz
Preceded by David G. Bassett	Director of the Defense Contract Management Agency; 2023–2025	Succeeded by Stephen R. Tedford
Preceded by Michael J. Schmidt	Program Executive Officer of the F-35 Lightning II Program Office; 2025-present	Incumbent
