= Sohl =

Sohl is a surname. Notable people with the surname include:

- Bob Sohl (1928–2001), American swimmer
- Jerry Sohl (1913–2002), American writer and scriptwriter
- Paul Sohl (born 1963), United States Navy officer
- Richard Sohl (1953–1990), American pianist, songwriter, and arranger

Fictional characters

- Nick Sohl, character in Known Space

== See also ==
- Komitat Sohl, the German-language name for the former Zólyom County of the Kingdom of Hungary
