= Michael J. Schmidt =

U.S. Air Force general

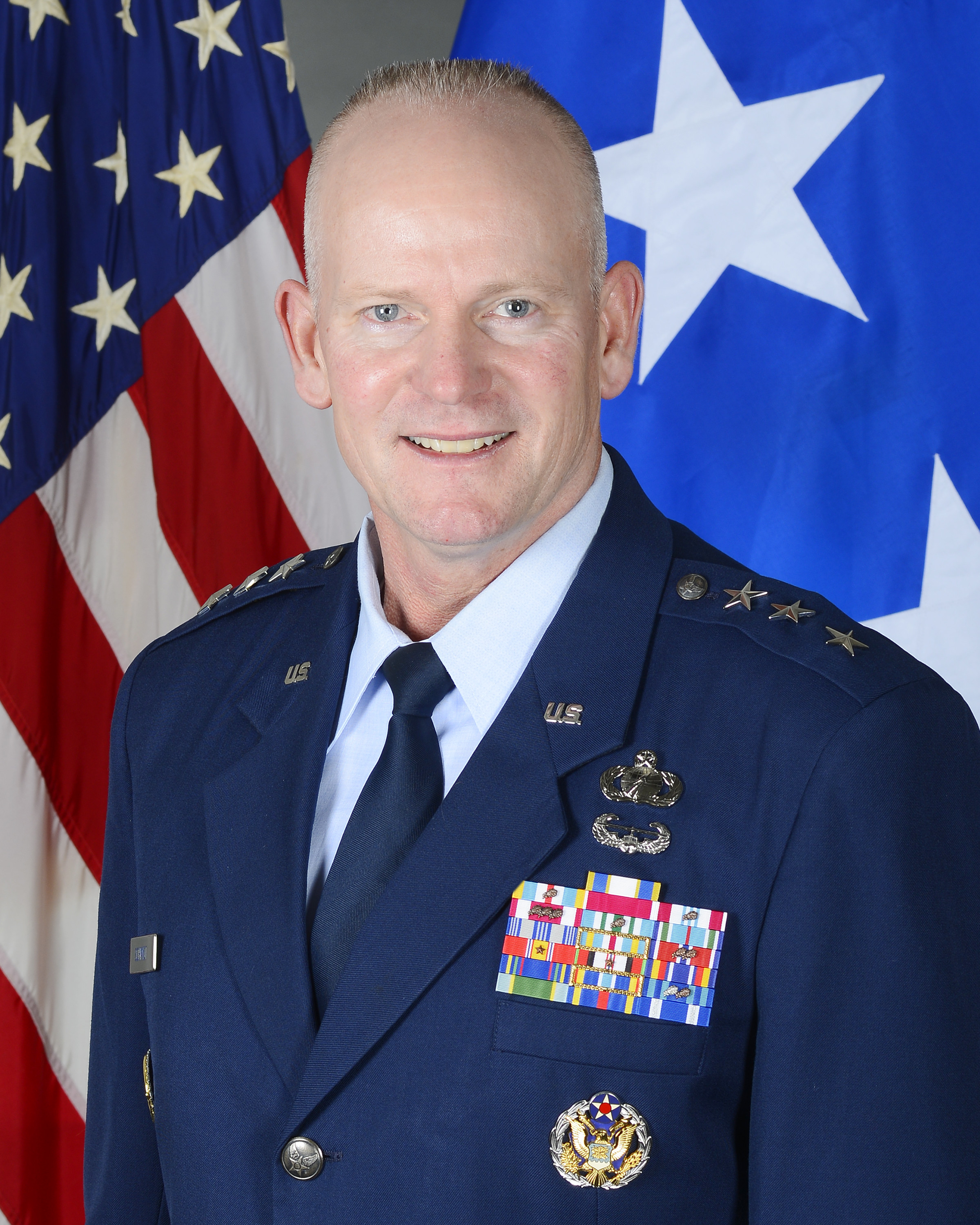
- Official portrait, 2022
- Military career
- Allegiance: United States
- Branch: United States Air Force
- Service years: 1990–2025
- Rank: Lieutenant General
- Commands: F-35 Lightning Joint Program Office; C3I Networks Directorate; Fighters and Bombers Directorate; ISR and SOF Directorate Directorate; 696th Armament Systems Squadron
- Awards: Air Force Distinguished Service Medal; Defense Superior Service Medal (2); Legion of Merit

Michael J. Schmidt is a retired United States Air Force lieutenant general who last served as the program executive officer of the PEO F-35 Lightning Joint Program Office from 2022 to 2025. Previously he served as director of the C3I Networks Directorate from 2018 to 2022. Before that, he was the director of the Fighters and Bombers Directorate.

Military offices
Preceded by Eric Fick	Director of the Fighters and Bombers Directorate; 2016–2018	Succeeded by Heath A. Collins
Preceded by Dwyer Dennis	Director of the C3I Networks Directorate; 2018–2022	Succeeded by Anthony Genatempo
Preceded by Eric Fick	Program Executive Officer of the F-35 Lightning II Joint Program Office; 2022–2025	Succeeded by Gregory Masiello
