= Eric Fick =

U.S. Air Force Lieutenant general

Eric T. Fick
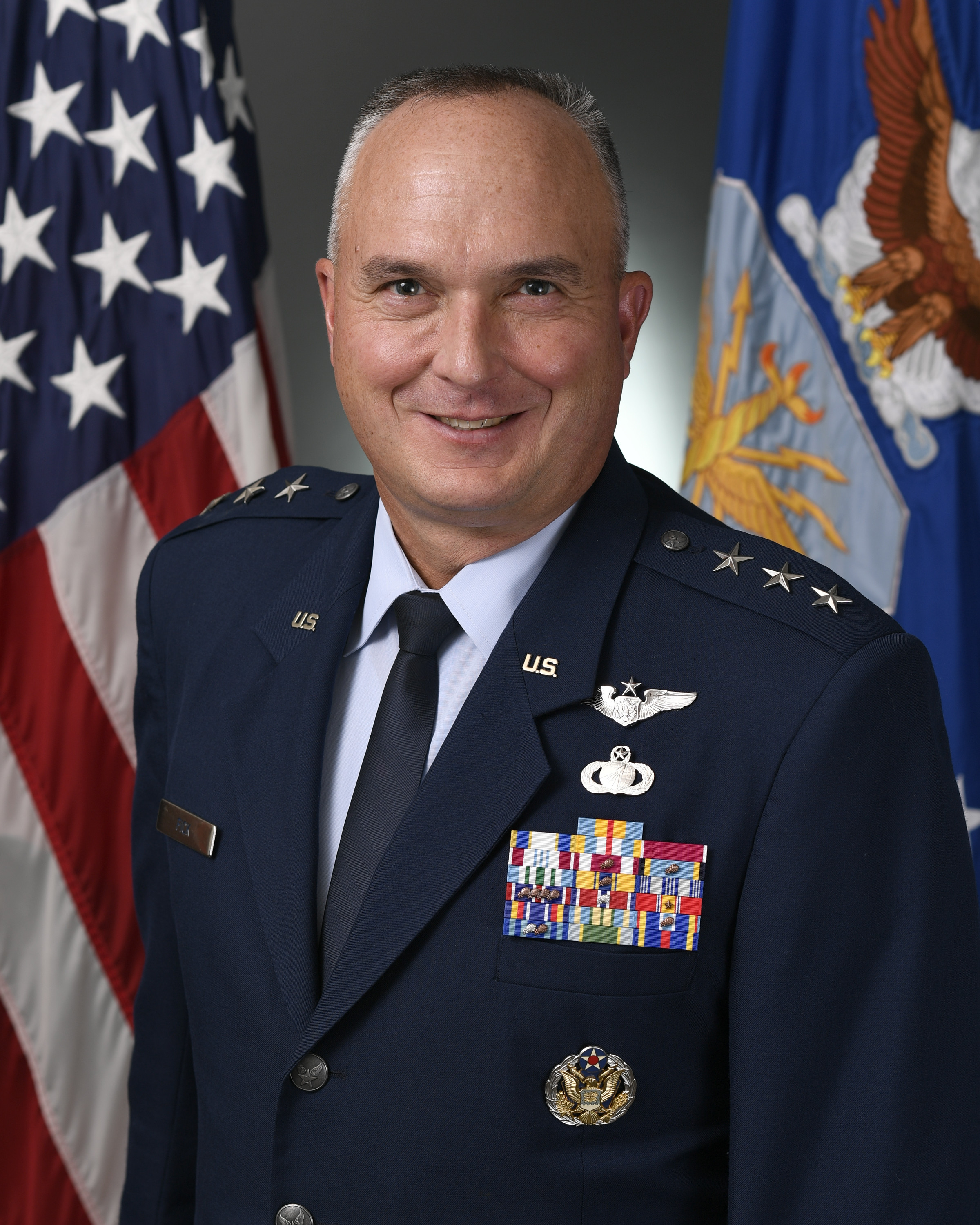
- Military career
- Allegiance: United States
- Branch: United States Air Force
- Service years: 1990–2022
- Rank: Lieutenant General
- Commands: F-35 Lightning II Joint Program Office; Advanced Combat Systems Group; 46th Test Squadron
- Awards: Defense Distinguished Service Medal; Air Force Distinguished Service Medal; Defense Superior Service Medal; Legion of Merit

Eric T. Fick is a retired United States Air Force lieutenant general who last served as the program executive officer of the F-35 Lightning II Joint Program Office. Previously, he was the deputy program executive officer for the same office.

== Effective dates of promotions ==
Rank	Date
Second lieutenant	July 23, 1990
First lieutenant	July 23, 1992
Captain	July 23, 1994
Major	September 1, 2001
Lieutenant colonel	May 1, 2005
Colonel	October 1, 2008
Brigadier general	October 3, 2014
Major general	August 3, 2018
Lieutenant general	July 11, 2019

Military offices
Preceded by ???	Director of the Fighters and Bombers Directorate; 2014–2016	Succeeded by Michael J. Schmidt
Preceded by Dwyer L. Dennis	Director for Global Reach Programs at the Office of the Assistant Secretary of the Air Force Acquisition, Technology, and Logistics; 2016–2017	Succeeded by Ryan Britton
Preceded by Mathias Winter	Deputy Program Executive Officer of the F-35 Lightning II Joint Program Office; 2017–2019	Succeeded by Carl Chebi
Preceded by Mathias Winter	Program Executive Officer of the F-35 Lightning II Joint Program Office; 2019–2022	Succeeded by Michael J. Schmidt
