= Heath Collins =

U.S. Air Force general

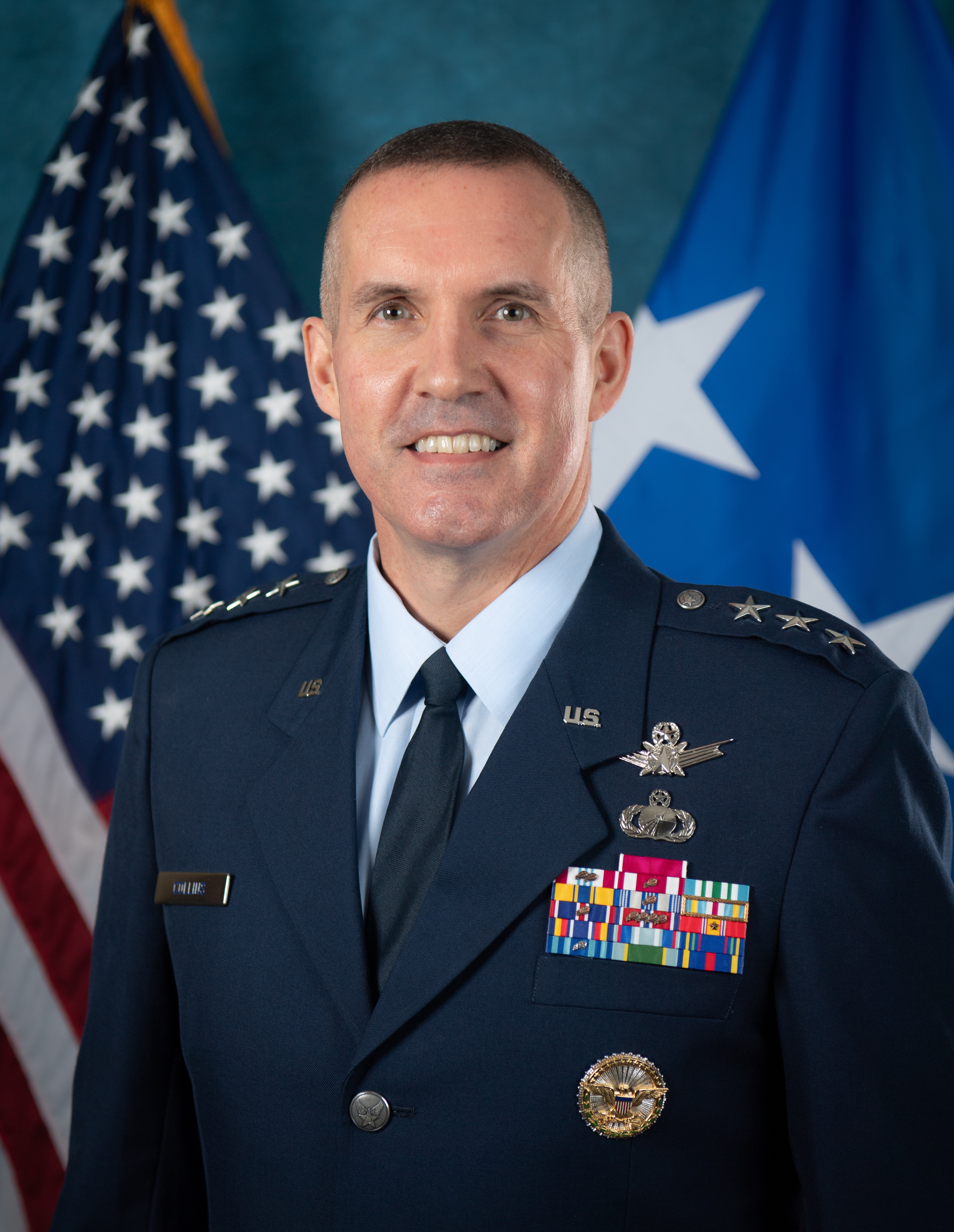
- Official portrait, 2023
- Born: c. 1971 (age 54–55)
- Education: Clarkson University (BS): Florida State University (MS); Air Command and Staff College
- Military career
- Allegiance: United States
- Branch: United States Air Force
- Service years: 1993–present
- Rank: Lieutenant General
- Commands: Missile Defense Agency
- Awards: Legion of Merit (2)

Heath A. Collins (born c. 1971) is the Director, Missile Defense Agency and advises the Under Secretary of Defense for Research and Engineering on Missile Defense programmatic policy, requirements, priorities, systems, resources and programs. MDA's global mission is to develop, test, field and sustain integrated, layered missile defense capabilities to defend the United States, its deployed forces, allies and friends against missile attacks in all phases of flight. Collins directs the $11 billion global organization with more than 9,000 military, civilian and contract personnel. He exercises management oversight for the Missile Defense System to include program management of missile defense resources which he synchronizes with the services in support of Combatant Command requirements.

Prior to assuming his current position, Lt. Gen. Collins was the Program Executive for Ground-Based Weapon Systems for the Missile Defense Agency, Redstone Arsenal, Alabama. Programs in Lt. Gen. Collins' portfolio included Ground-Based Midcourse Defense, Terminal High Altitude Area Defense System, four Joint U.S. and Israeli programs and several classified programs collectively valued at over $3.4 billion annually.

Lt. Gen. Collins entered the Air Force in 1993, receiving his commission through the Reserve Officer Training Corps program at Clarkson University. His acquisition, space, test, operations and staff assignments encompass weapons, electronic countermeasures, space, radar, Intelligence, Surveillance and Reconnaissance, nuclear, fighter, bomber and missile defense systems. He has served in numerous program management and senior leader positions including Air Force Program Executive Officer for Weapons, Air Force Program Executive Officer for Fighters and Bombers, System Program Director for the Ground-Based Strategic Deterrent (Sentinel) program, Deputy Director for the Infrared Space Systems Directorate and the Remote Sensing Systems Directorate, Deputy Group Commander, Wideband Satellite Communications Systems and Commander, Space Based Infrared System Space Squadron. Lt. Gen. Collins has also served in the Office of the Under Secretary of Defense for Intelligence, overseeing the department's Airborne ISR; Space; and Special Programs. He is a graduate of the Air Command and Staff College and the Industrial College of the Armed Forces. He holds master’s degrees from Florida State University, Air University and National Defense University.

== Awards and decorations ==
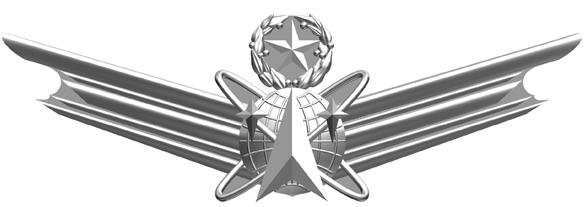

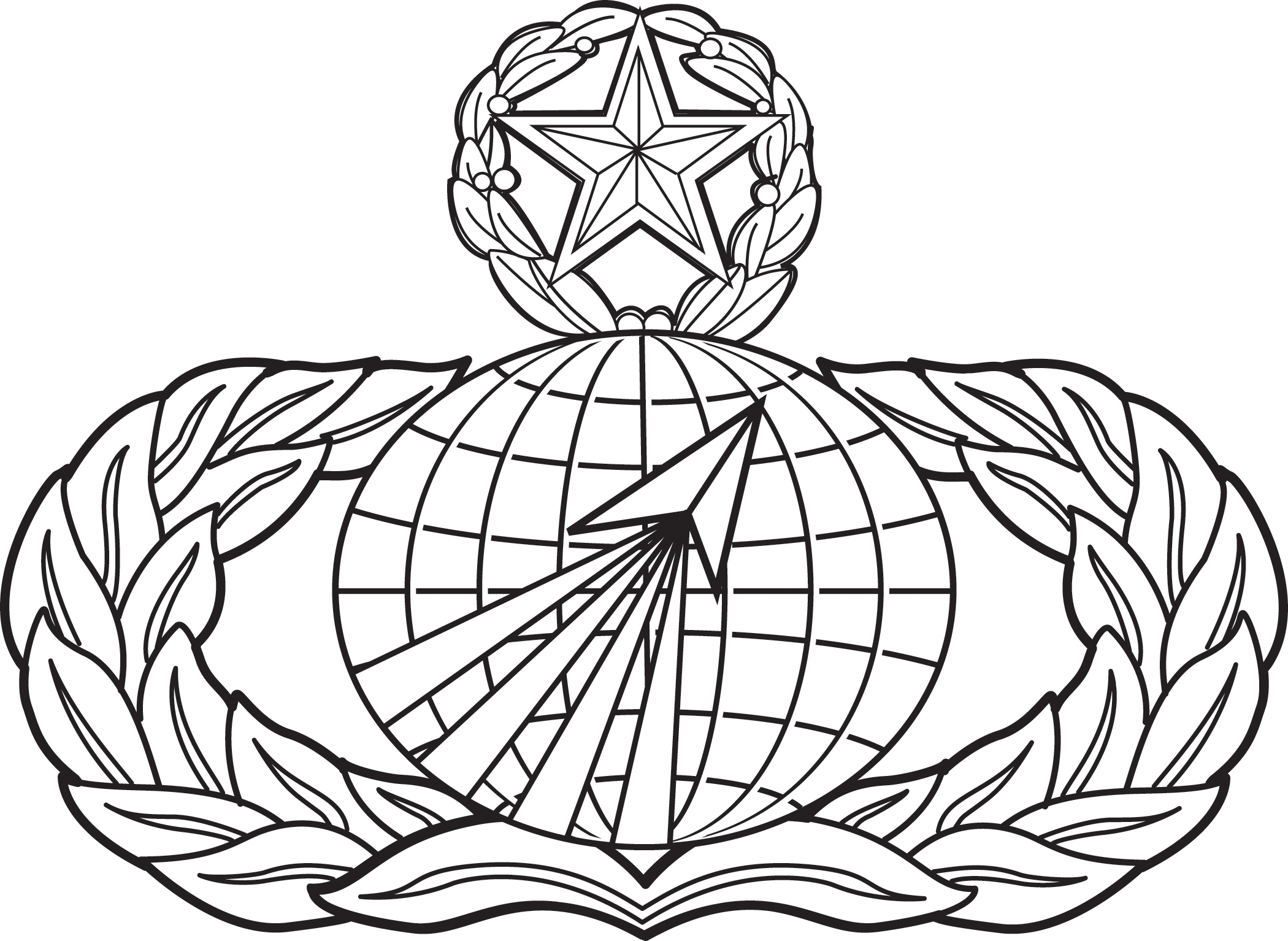

Master Space Operations Badge
Master Acquisitions and Financial Management Badge
Legion of Merit
Defense Meritorious Service Medal with two bronze oak leaf clusters	Meritorious Service Medal with bronze oak leaf cluster	Joint Service Commendation Medal
Air and Space Commendation Medal	Air and Space Achievement Medal with bronze oak leaf cluster	Joint Meritorious Unit Award
Air and Space Outstanding Unit Award with bronze oak leaf cluster	Air and Space Organizational Excellence Award with four bronze oak leaf clusters	National Defense Service Medal with bronze service star
Global War on Terrorism Service Medal	Air and Space Campaign Medal	Nuclear Deterrence Operations Service Medal
Air and Space Longevity Service Award with silver oak leaf cluster	Small Arms Expert Marksmanship Ribbon	Air Force Training Ribbon
Office of the Secretary of Defense Identification Badge

Military offices
Preceded by Michael J. Schmidt	Program Executive Officer for Fighters and Bombers of the United States Air Force; 2018–2020	Succeeded by Dale R. White (Fighters and Advanced Aircraft); John P. Newberry (Bombers)
Preceded by Anthony Genatempo	Program Executive Officer for Weapons and Director of the Armament Directorate of the Air Force Life Cycle Management Center; 2020–2022	Succeeded by Jason E. Bartolomei
Preceded by Philip Garrant	Program Executive for Ground-based Weapon Systems of the Missile Defense Agency; 2022–2023	Succeeded by D. Jason Cothern
Preceded by Jon A. Hill	Director of the Missile Defense Agency; 2023–present	Incumbent
