= Timothy S. Matthews =

United States Navy admiral (born 1958)

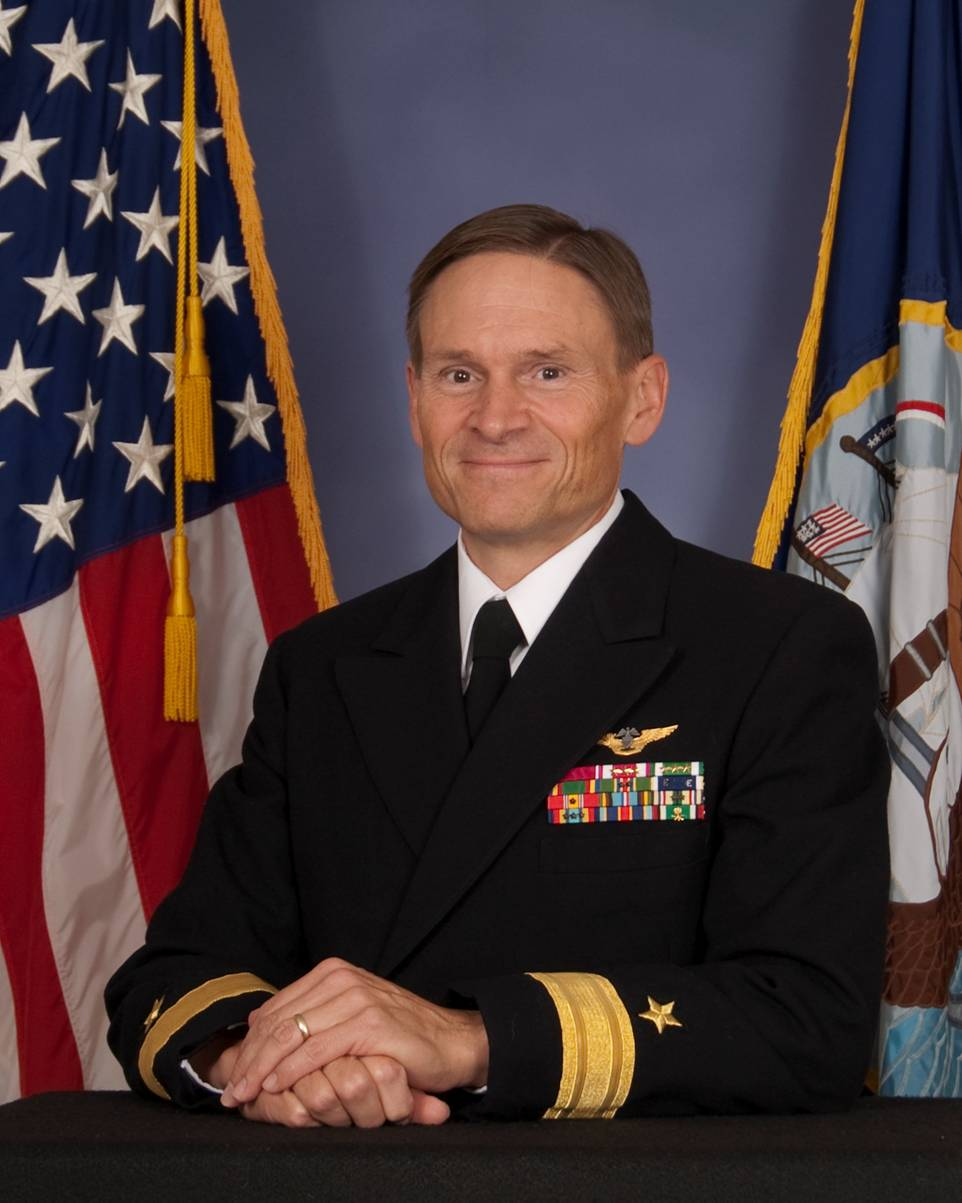
- Born: 1958 (age 67–68)
- Military career
- Allegiance: United States
- Branch: United States Navy
- Service years: 1982–2014
- Rank: Rear Admiral
- Awards: Legion of Merit (2); Meritorious Service Medal (4); Navy and Marine Corps Commendation Medal (4)

Rear Admiral Timothy Stirling Matthews (born 1958) is a former United States Navy admiral. His naval career began in 1982 and spanned almost 32 years. In early 2014, he retired from the Navy and later joined Lockheed Martin, providing aviation sustainment operations support to the US military.

== Early life and education ==
Timothy Stirling Matthews was born in 1958. He graduated from the University of Colorado Boulder in 1980 with a Bachelor of Science degree in aerospace engineering.

== Naval career ==
Matthews joined the United States Navy, and was commissioned as an aeronautical maintenance duty officer through its Aviation Officer Candidate School in Pensacola, Florida, in August 1982. He attended the Naval Postgraduate School, Monterey, California, from which he received a master's degree in aeronautical engineering in 1995. He served on deployments in the Mediterranean Sea, Western Pacific, and Persian Gulf on board the aircraft carriers USS John F. Kennedy, USS Saratoga and USS Carl Vinson. He also served ashore with Fleet Air Reconnaissance Squadron 2 (VQ-2) in Rota, Spain, Tactical Electronic Warfare Squadron 132 (VAQ-132) at Naval Air Station Whidbey Island in Washington, and Carrier Air Wing Fourteen.

Matthews served as Consolidated Automated Support Systems (CASS) Fleet Introduction leader in office PMA-260 of the Naval Air Systems Command. In September 2004, he became the director of the Joint Depot Maintenance Activities Group at Wright Patterson Air Force Base. He became executive officer the Naval Air Station Jacksonville in 2005. In this role he oversaw a series of cultural changes to increase organizational efficiency, including the implementation of Lean Six Sigma, and Sean Covey's Four Disciplines of Execution.

On 17 August 2007 Matthews assumed command of the Fleet Readiness Center Southeast. He was promoted to the rank of rear admiral (lower half) on 25 June 2009. In August 2009, he became the commander, Fleet Readiness Centers and NAVAIR Assistant Commander for Logistics and Industrial Operations. The following year, he was one of three admirals on the administrative panel that reviewed the case of astronaut Lisa Nowak, and recommended her separation from the Navy with an other than honorable discharge and reduction in rank.

His final assignment, in August 2011, was as director of the Fleet Readiness Division. In this role he was confronted with a major crisis in the form of the United States budget sequestration in 2013. Faced with automatic budget cuts, Matthews implemented some efficiency changes, and deferred the scheduled maintenance of some ships until 2014, but continuing high-tempo operations with ships beyond their scheduled maintenance periods shortened their service life, which would ultimately reduce the size of the Navy. The sequestration affected not only the funds available for maintenance activities, but also the time and resources through restriction on overtime. Reductions in training time for ships' crews increased the maintenance difficulties in the medium term, and the possibility of layoffs from contractors and the consequent loss of skilled labor posed a long-term threat.

Matthews was also able to obtain some relief by reprogramming funds earmarked for other purposes. All these were short-term measures that assumed the crisis would soon be over, and would not continue into 2014, but this was far from certain. In August 2013, Matthews appeared before the House Armed Services Committee to plead for relief from sequestration. Ultimately, the political crisis was resolved by the Bipartisan Budget Act of 2013, which ended sequestration and restored funding, but Matthews decided to retire.

Awards and decorations he received include the Legion of Merit twice, the Meritorious Service Medal four times, the Navy and Marine Corps Commendation Medal four times, the Virgil Lemmon Award for Maintenance Excellence, and the Association of Old Crows' Maintenance Award.

== Business career ==
Matthews officially retired from the Navy on 1 January 2014. On 1 June 2014, Matthews joined Lockheed Martin in Fort Worth, Texas, where he worked as vice president for F-35 Lightning II Sustainment Operations. In this role he oversaw the implementation of a suite of next generation analytics, using artificial intelligence and digital transformation technologies to improve the efficiency of aircraft sustainment activities for Lockheed Martin's F-35, C-130J Super Hercules and the LM-100J Hercules programs. The prospective payoff was huge; it was estimated that sustainment of the F-35 alone would cost more than $1 trillion. Matthews rejected an April 2019 proposal by William B. Roper Jr., the Assistant Secretary of the Air Force (Acquisition, Technology and Logistics), for the government to reacquire intellectual property rights on military equipment so that sustainment activities could be carried out by the Air Force or contractors other than the aircraft manufacturer. "I’m more convinced than ever", Matthews said "that that would be a mistake."
