= Jon A. Hill =

U.S. Navy admiral

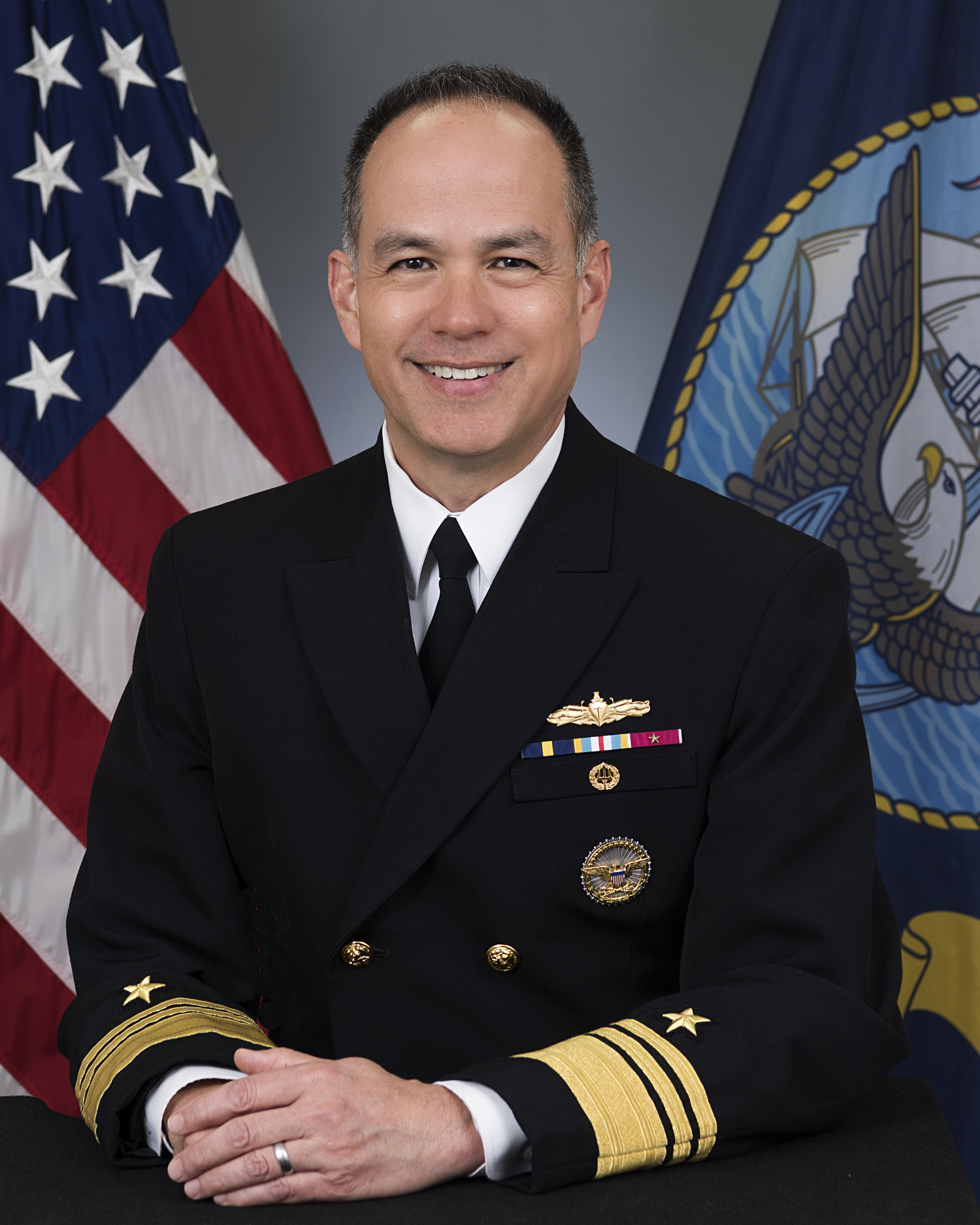
- Hill in 2019
- Born: September 19, 1963 (age 63); Fort Bliss, Texas, U.S.
- Military career
- Allegiance: United States
- Branch: United States Navy
- Service years: 1985–2023
- Rank: Vice Admiral
- Commands: Missile Defense Agency
- Awards: Defense Distinguished Service Medal; Navy Distinguished Service Medal; Defense Superior Service Medal (2); Legion of Merit (2)
- Jon A. Hill's voice Hill's opening statement at a House Armed Services Strategic Forces Subcommittee hearing on the FY2024 missile budget request Recorded April 18, 2023

Jon Anthony Hill (born September 19, 1963) is a retired United States Navy vice admiral who last served as the director of the Missile Defense Agency. Previously, he was the Deputy Director of the same agency. Born and raised at Fort Bliss, Texas, Hill received a bachelor's degree in biology and chemistry from St. Mary's University and later earned an M.S. degree in applied physics and ordnance engineering from the Naval Postgraduate School.

== Personal ==
Hill is the son of Albert Bevins Hill (March 1, 1930 – October 2, 2011) and Bessie (Luke) Hill (January 19, 1926 – February 19, 1999). He has two sisters and one brother.

== Awards and decorations ==

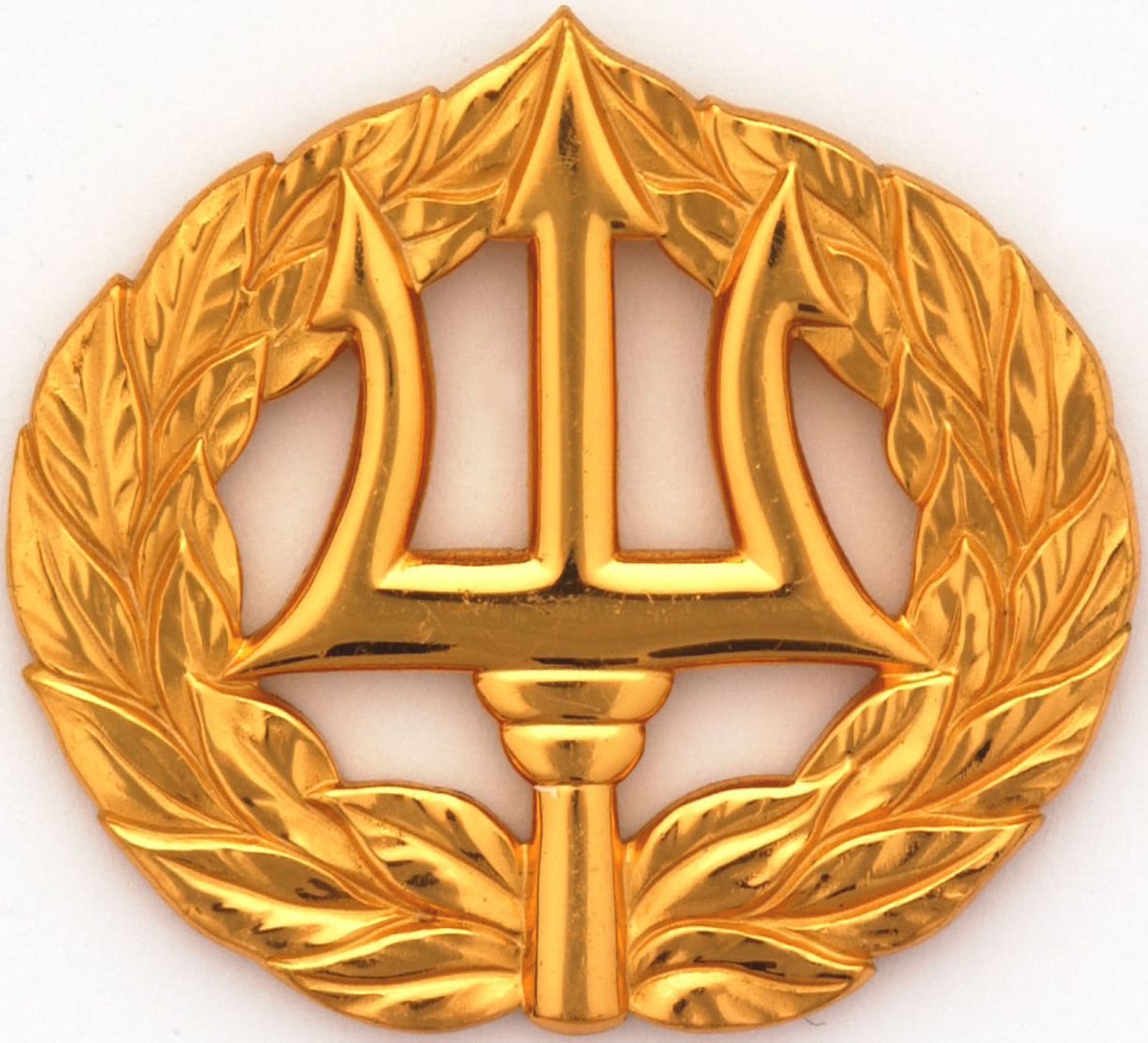

Surface Warfare Officer Pin
Navy Distinguished Service Medal	Defense Superior Service Medal	Legion of Merit with award star
Defense Meritorious Service Medal	Meritorious Service Medal with two award stars	Joint Service Commendation Medal
Navy and Marine Corps Commendation Medal with award star	Army Commendation Medal	Navy and Marine Corps Achievement Medal with award star
Joint Meritorious Unit Award	Navy Meritorious Unit Commendation	National Defense Service Medal with bronze service star
Navy Sea Service Deployment Ribbon with bronze service star	Coast Guard Special Operations Service Ribbon	Navy Expert Pistol Shot Medal
Navy Command Ashore insignia
Office of the Secretary of Defense Identification Badge

Military offices
Preceded by ???	Program Executive Officer for Integrated Warfare Systems of the United States Navy; 2014–2016	Succeeded by Douglas W. Small
Preceded by Kenneth E. Todorov	Deputy Director of the Missile Defense Agency; 2016–2019	Succeeded by ???
Preceded by Samuel A. Greaves	Director of the Missile Defense Agency; 2019–2023	Succeeded by Heath Collins
