= Ryan Britton =

U.S. Air Force general

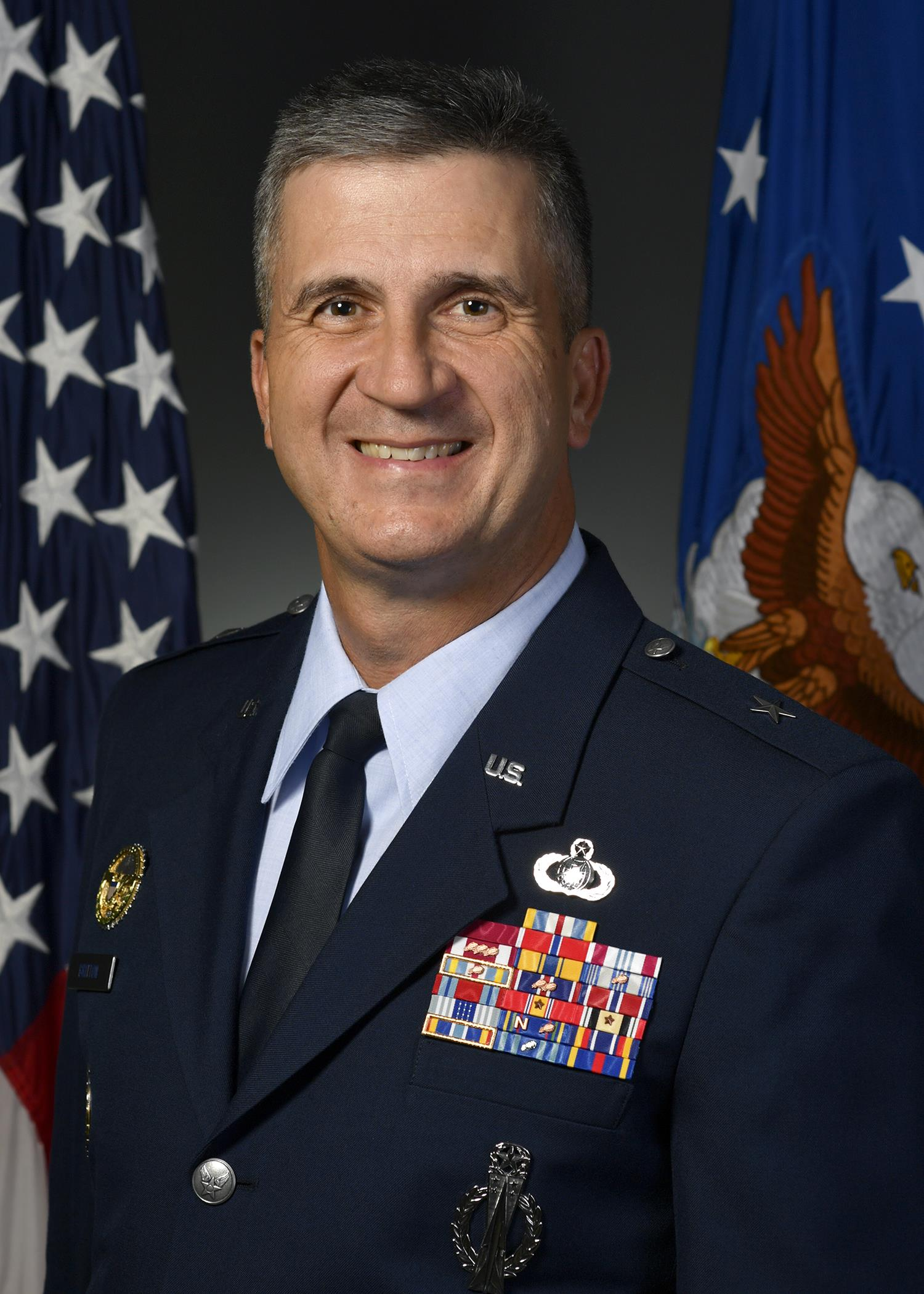
- Official portrait, 2017
- Military career
- Allegiance: United States
- Branch: United States Air Force
- Service years: 1991–present
- Rank: Brigadier general
- Commands: Presidential and Executive Airlift Directorate, Air Force Life Cycle Management Center; Intercontinental Ballistic Missile Systems Directorate, Air Force Nuclear Weapons Center; 730th Aircraft Sustainment Support Squadron
- Awards: Defense Superior Service Medal; Legion of Merit

Ryan L. Britton is a retired United States Air Force brigadier general who had served as the director of the Presidential and Executive Airlift Directorate of the Air Force Life Cycle Management Center. He previously was the director for global power programs at the Office of the Assistant Secretary of the Air Force Acquisition, Technology, and Logistics.

Military offices
Preceded by Eric Fick	Director for Global Reach Programs at the Office of the Assistant Secretary of the Air Force Acquisition, Technology, and Logistics; 2017–2018	Succeeded by Kyle Kremer
Preceded by Michael Fantini	Director for Global Power Programs at the Office of the Assistant Secretary of the Air Force Acquisition, Technology, and Logistics; 2018–2019	Succeeded by David A. Krumm
Preceded by Duke Richardson	Director of the Presidential and Executive Airlift Directorate of the Air Force Life Cycle Management Center; 2019–2021	Succeeded by Jason E. Lindsey
