= Admiral Small =

Admiral Small may refer to:

- Douglas W. Small (born 1965), U.S. Navy rear admiral
- Ernest G. Small (1888–1944), U.S. Navy rear admiral
- William N. Small (1927–2016), U.S. Navy admiral
