= Anthony Genatempo =

U.S. Air Force general

Anthony W. Genatempo
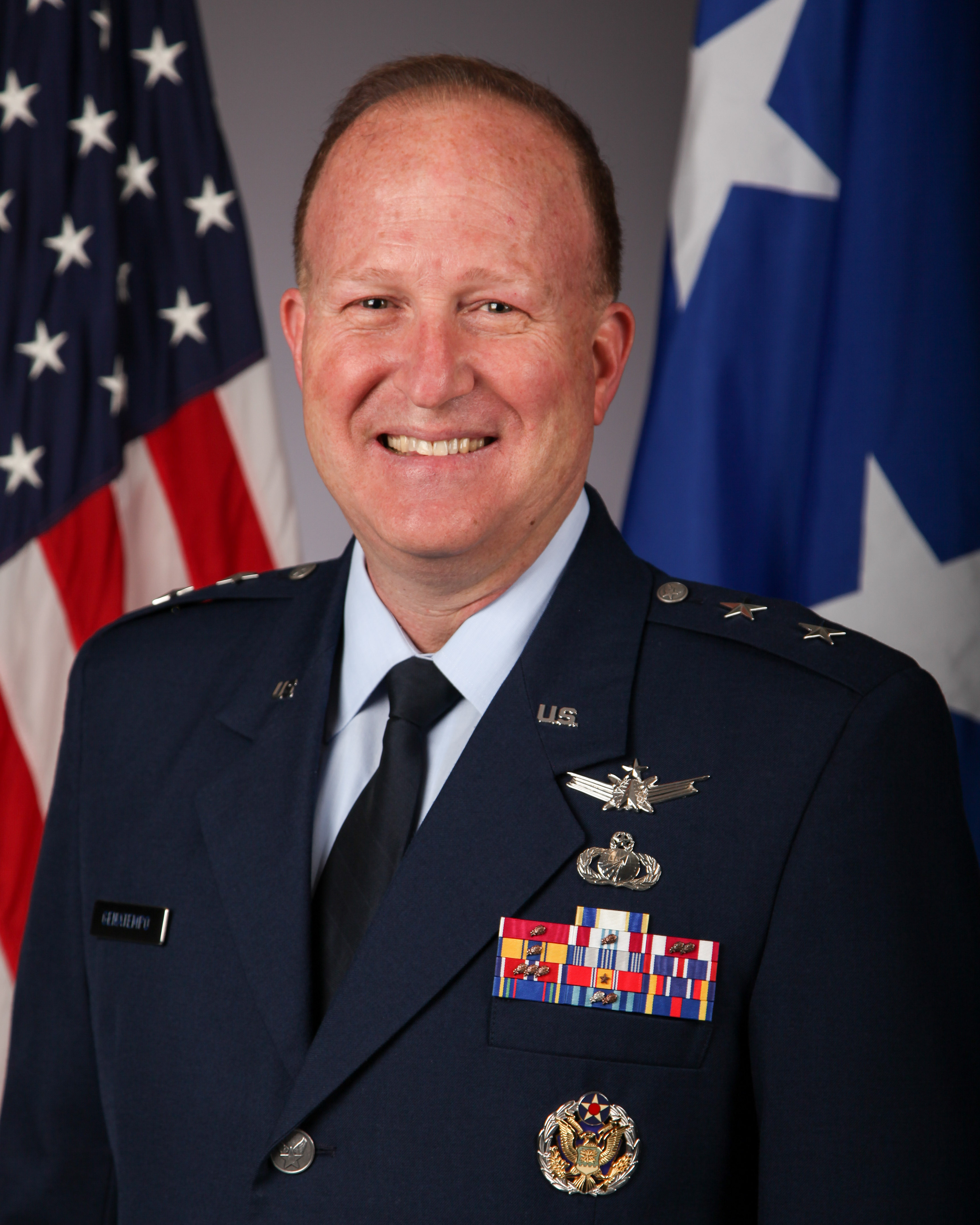
- Military career
- Allegiance: United States
- Branch: United States Air Force
- Service years: 1991–2025
- Rank: Major General
- Nickname: Awgie
- Commands: C3I Networks Directorate, AFLCMC; Air Force Nuclear Weapons Center; Armament Directorate, AFLCMC; 640th Aeronautical System Support Squadron
- Awards: Defense Distinguished Service Medal; Legion of Merit (2)

Anthony W. Genatempo is a retired United States Air Force major general who last served as the director of the C3I Networks Directorate at the Air Force Life Cycle Management Center from 2022 to 2025. He previously commanded the Air Force Nuclear Weapons Center from 2020 to 2022.

Military offices
Preceded by Shaun Morris	Director of the Armament Directorate of the Air Force Life Cycle Management Center; 2017–2020	Succeeded by Heath Collins
Preceded by Shaun Morris	Commander of the Air Force Nuclear Weapons Center; 2020–2022	Succeeded by John P. Newberry
Preceded by Michael J. Schmidt	Director of the C3I Networks Directorate of the Air Force Life Cycle Management Center; 2022–2025	Vacant
