= Fleet Readiness Center East =

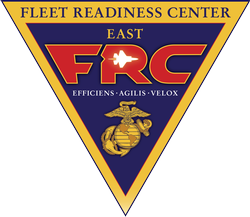
- Active: Dec. 16, 1943 - Present
- Branch: US Navy

Fleet Readiness Center East (FRCE) is a US Navy aviation repair and maintenance facility located in Havelock, North Carolina on Marine Corps Air Station Cherry Point. FRC East is one of nine main subsidiaries of the Navy's Fleet Readiness Center Command

== History ==
FRC East began operations during World War II as the Overhaul and Repair Department(O & R) at MCAS Cherry Point, N.C. The O & R covered more than 500,000 square feet when it opened Dec. 16, 1943.

During the 1960s, FRC East greatly expanded floor space to accommodate more room for repairing aircraft. In April 1967 it became known as the Naval Air Rework Facility, a separate command under the Naval Air Systems Command. Subsequently, the facility was renamed Naval Aviation Depot Cherry Point in March 1987. In 1990 for Desert Shield operations, FRCE provided engines, components, aircraft, ground support equipment and squadron support as well as field team deployments to various locations. Following the 2005 Base Realignment and Closure, the facility was realigned and its name changed to Fleet Readiness Center East in October 2006. FRC East in 2017 received its first F35C Lightning II and successfully modified and upgraded it, showcasing its work as a depot-level aviation maintenance site for the F35. As of 2017, FRC East is the largest industrial employer in Eastern North Carolina. FRC East's workforce consists of 4200 Marines, Sailors and Civilians with an annual revenue exceeding $720 million.

== Responsibility ==
Fleet Readiness Center East, one of the six Fleet readiness centers operated by the U.S. Navy, has been in operation since the 1940s, supporting the long-term sustainment of vertical lift aircraft by performing maintenance, repair, and overhaul (MRO) functions on airframes, engines, and components. In addition to Repair and Maintenance functions, FRC East also provide engineering and logistics support to many Navy/Marine Corps platforms.

== See also ==
- Fleet Readiness Center Mid-Atlantic
- Fleet Readiness Center Northwest
- Fleet Readiness Center Southeast
- Fleet Readiness Center Southwest
- Fleet Readiness Center West
- Fleet Readiness Center Western Pacific
