= Fleet Readiness Center West =

- Active: November 2008 - Present
- Branch: US Navy

Commanders
- Commanding Officer: CPT. James S. Carmichael
- Executive Officer: CPT. Joseph A. Hidalgo
- Command Master Chief: CMDCM. Kenneth A. Smart

Fleet Readiness Center West (FRCW) is located in Lemoore Station, California, and is part of Naval Air Station Lemoore. It is a subsidiary of the Navy's Fleet Readiness Center Command

== Responsibilities ==
FRC West provides intermediate and depot level aviation maintenance, component repair and logistics support specializing in the FA-18, including all type/model/series at all locations/detachments. The Aircraft Modification Line in Lemoore, California specializes in Phased Maintenance Intervals (PMI) and Aircraft Modifications (MODs) for the FA-18 platform and along with a Depot detachment in Fallon, Nevada perform In Service Repairs (ISR's) on all Navy type/model/series. In addition FRCW's detachments in Fort Worth, Fallon and China Lake provides support E-2, H-60, F-5, F-16, T-39, H-60, AH-1, AV-8 and C-130 platforms.

== History ==
In 2015, Capt. Kenneth Brown, was removed from his post "due to a loss of confidence in his ability to lead FRC West", by Rear Adm. Paul Sohl, CO of Fleet Readiness Centers. In 2018, FRCW held a change of command for the CO, replacing Capt. Lehee with Capt. Washburn.

== See also ==
- Fleet Readiness Center East
- Fleet Readiness Center Mid-Atlantic
- Fleet Readiness Center Northwest
- Fleet Readiness Center Southeast
- Fleet Readiness Center Southwest
- Fleet Readiness Center Western Pacific
