= Carl Chebi =

U.S. Navy admiral (born 1965)

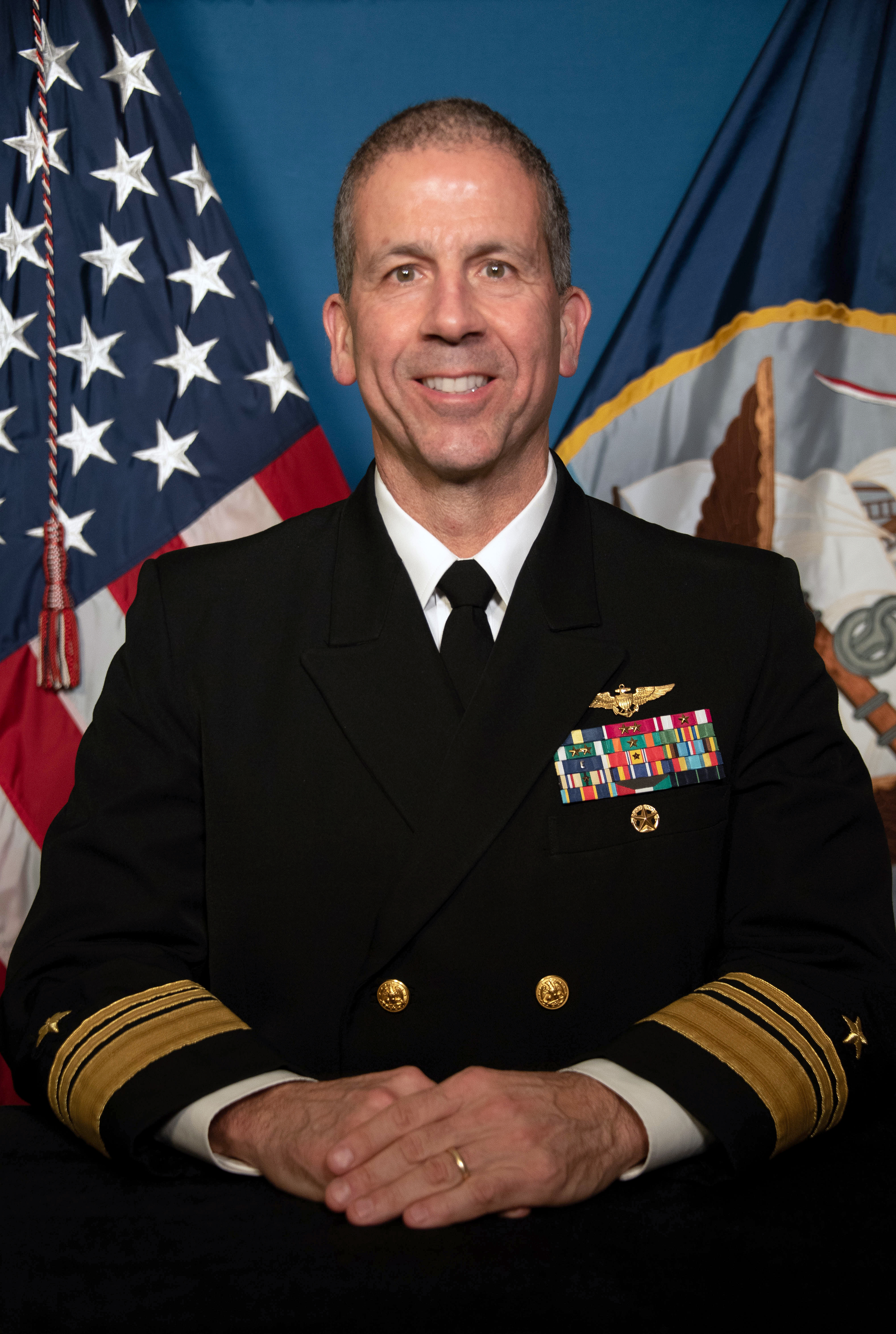
- Official portrait, 2022
- Born: 1965 (age 60–61)
- Military career
- Allegiance: United States
- Branch: United States Navy
- Service years: 1987–2025
- Rank: Vice Admiral
- Commands: Naval Air Systems Command; VFA-192
- Conflicts: Gulf War
- Awards: Navy Distinguished Service Medal; Legion of Merit (3)

Carl Paul Chebi (born 1965) is a retired United States Navy vice admiral who served as the commander of Naval Air Systems Command from September 9, 2021 to August 1, 2025. He most recently served as the Deputy Program Executive Officer of the F-35 Lightning II Joint Program Office from 30 September 2019 to 9 September 2021. Previously, he served as the Program Executive Officer for Command, Control, Communications, Computers, and Intelligence (C4I) and Space Systems of the Naval Information Warfare Systems Command from 2017 to 2019.

Raised in Holliston, Massachusetts, Chebi attended the Rensselaer Polytechnic Institute and earned a Bachelor of Science degree in computer systems engineering. He later graduated from flight school, Naval Test Pilot School and Navy Fighter Weapons School.

Military offices
Preceded by Christian D. Becker	Program Executive Officer for Command, Control, Communications, Computers, and Intelligence (C4I) and Space Systems of the Naval Information Warfare Systems Command; 2017–2019	Succeeded by Kurt Rothenhaus
Preceded by Eric Fick	Deputy Program Executive Officer of the F-35 Lightning II Joint Program Office; 2019–2021	Vacant
Preceded by G. Dean Peters	Commander of the Naval Air Systems Command; 2021–2025	Succeeded by John E. Dougherty IV
