= David Bassett =

U.S. Army general

David G. Bassett
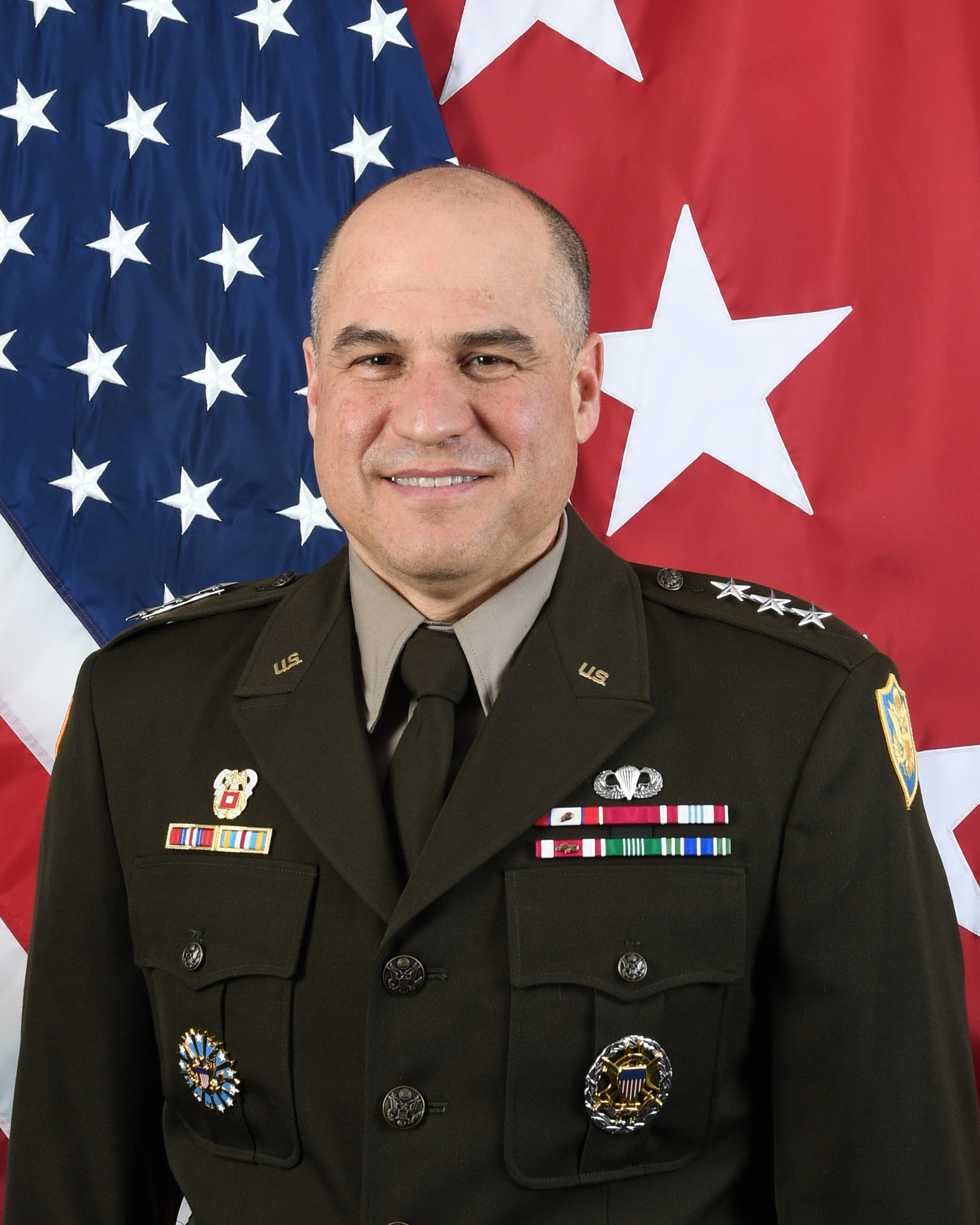
- Official portrait, 2021
- Born: September 26, 1966 (age 60); Würzburg, Germany
- Military career
- Allegiance: United States
- Branch: United States Army
- Service years: 1988–2024
- Rank: Lieutenant General
- Commands: Defense Contract Management Agency
- Awards: Defense Distinguished Service Medal

David G. Bassett (born September 26, 1966) is a retired United States Army lieutenant general who last served as the Director of the Defense Contract Management Agency. Previously, he was the Program Executive Officer for Command, Control and Communication (Tactical) of the United States Army.

Military offices
Preceded by ???	Program Executive Officer for Ground Combat Systems of the United States Army; 2013–2018	Succeeded by Brian P. Cummings
Preceded by Gary Martin	Program Executive Officer for Command, Control and Communication (Tactical) of the United States Army; 2018–2020	Succeeded by Robert M. Collins
Preceded by David H. Lewis	Director of the Defense Contract Management Agency; 2020–2023	Succeeded by Gregory Masiello
