= Michael Fantini =

Retired U.S. Air Force general

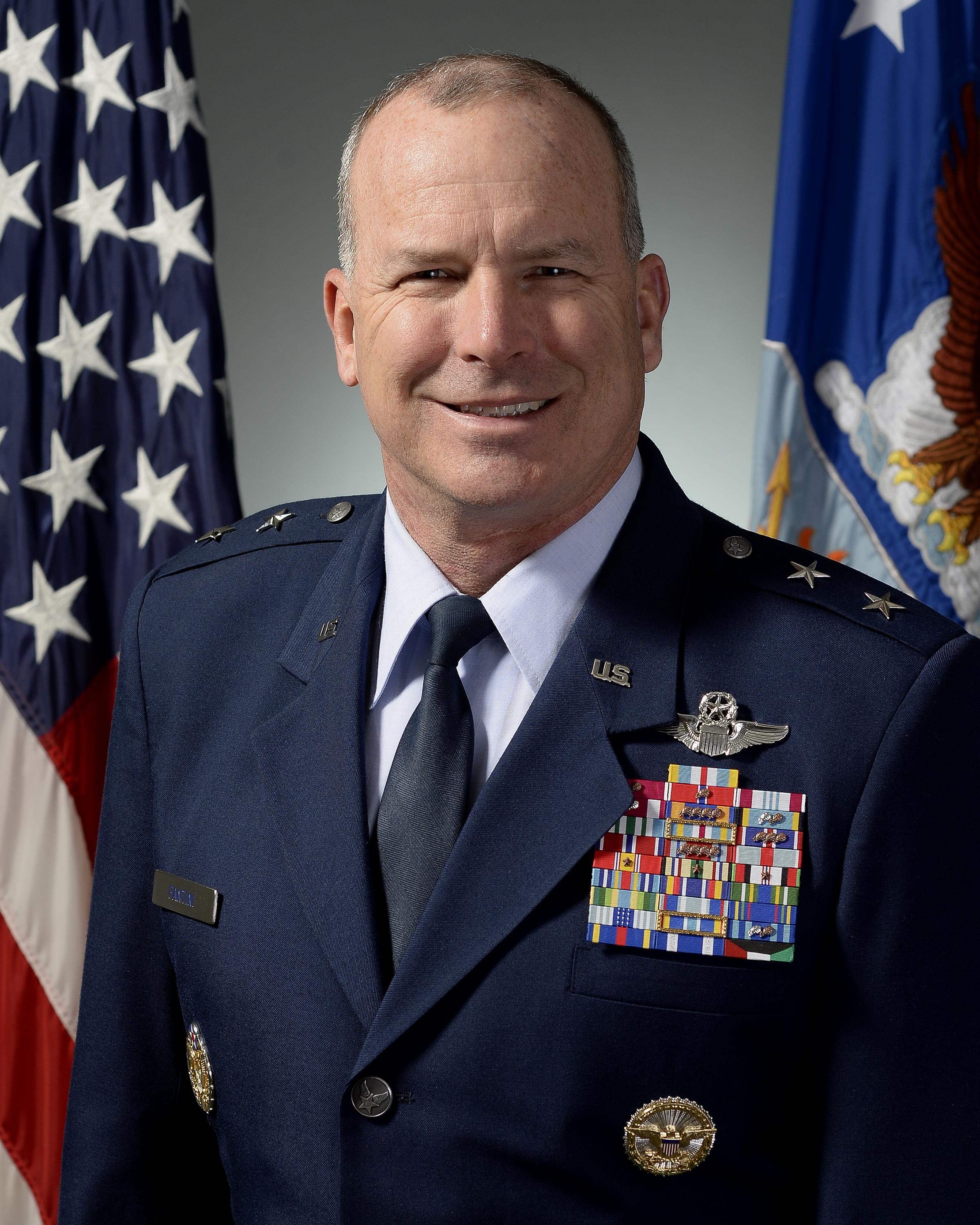
- Official portrait, 2017
- Military career
- Allegiance: United States
- Branch: United States Air Force
- Service years: 1986–2020
- Rank: Major general
- Commands: Air Force Warfighting Integration Capability; Kandahar Airfield; 451st Air Expeditionary Wing; 82nd Training Wing; 332nd Expeditionary Operations Group; 510th Fighter Squadron
- Awards: Defense Superior Service Medal (2); Legion of Merit (2); Bronze Star Medal (2)

Michael A. Fantini is a retired United States Air Force major general who last served as the commander of the Air Force Warfighting Integration Capability. Previously, he was the director of global power programs in the Office of the Assistant Secretary of the Air Force for Acquisition. Fantini earned a bachelor's degree in mechanical engineering from The Catholic University of America in 1986. He later received a master's degree in aeronautical science from Embry–Riddle Aeronautical University in 1996 and a master's degree in national security studies from the National War College in 2005.

Military offices
Preceded by ???	Commander of the 82nd Training Wing; 2012–2013	Succeeded by Scott Kindsvater
Preceded by John L. Dolan	Commander of the 451st Air Expeditionary Wing and Kandahar Airfield; 2013–2014	Succeeded by Scott Campbell as Commander of the 451st Air Expeditionary Group
New office	Commander of the Kandahar Airfield; 2014–2015	Succeeded by ???
Preceded by ???	Principal Director for Middle East Policy of the Office of the Under Secretary of Defense for Policy; 2015–2017	Succeeded by Joseph W. Rank
Preceded by Jon A. Norman	Director of Global Power Programs in the Office of the Assistant Secretary of the Air Force for Acquisition; 2017–2018	Succeeded by Ryan Britton
Preceded by Clinton Crosier	Commander of the Air Force Warfighting Integration Capability; 2018–2020	Succeeded by David A. Harris Jr.
Preceded by Timothy G. Fay	Deputy Chief of Staff for Strategy, Integration, and Requirements of the United States Air Force; Acting; 2020	Succeeded by S. Clinton Hinote
