= G. Dean Peters =

U.S. Navy admiral

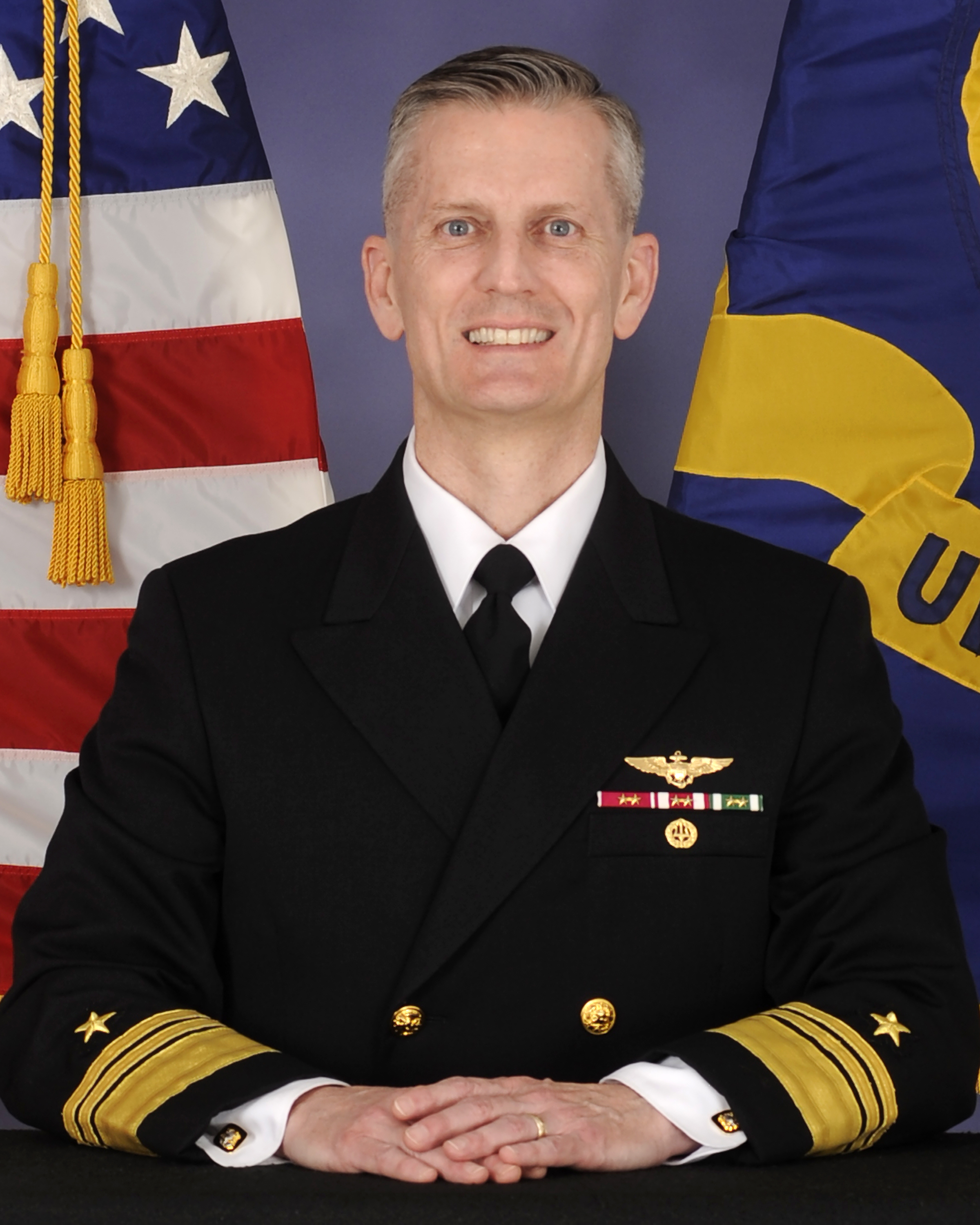
- Born: 1963 (age 62–63); Louisville, Kentucky
- Military career
- Allegiance: United States
- Branch: United States Navy
- Service years: 1985–2021
- Rank: Vice Admiral
- Commands: Naval Air Systems Command; Naval Air Warfare Center Aircraft Division; PMA-274; HX-21
- Awards: Legion of Merit (3)

Gordon Dean Peters (born 1963) is a retired United States Navy vice admiral who last served as the commander of the Naval Air Systems Command from May 31, 2018 to September 9, 2021. He previously served as the Program Executive Officer for Air Anti-Submarine Warfare, Assault, and Special Mission Programs of the United States Navy. Peters graduated from the United States Naval Academy in 1985 and was designated a naval aviator in 1986. He earned a Master of Science degree in aeronautical engineering from the Naval Postgraduate School in 1992. Peters also holds a post-graduate degree in telecommunications and has graduated from the Naval Test Pilot School.

Military offices
Preceded by ???	Commander of the Naval Air Warfare Center Aircraft Division; 2014–2016	Succeeded by Shane G. Gahagan
Preceded by Paul A. Grosklags	Program Executive Officer for Air Anti-Submarine Warfare, Assault, and Special Mission Programs of the United States Navy; 2016–2018	Succeeded by Gregory L. Masiello
Preceded by Paul A. Grosklags	Commander of the Naval Air Systems Command; 2018–2021	Succeeded by Carl P. Chebi
