= Fleet Readiness Center Mid-Atlantic =

Coordinates: 36°49′14″N 76°02′00″W

- Active: October 2006- Present
- Branch: US Navy

Commanders
- Commanding Officer: CAPT Rick Foster
- Executive Officer: CAPT Christopher Grimes
- Command Master Chief: CMDCM James Werner

Fleet Readiness Center Mid-Atlantic (FRCMA) is an American naval aviation maintenance and repair facility headquartered on board NAS Oceana. It is one of 6 main subsidiaries of the Fleet Readiness Centers. FRCMA currently has nearly 2,500 sailors, marines and civilian workers.

== Services ==
Fleet Readiness Center Mid-Atlantic performs scheduled maintenance inspection and repair, unscheduled emergency in-service repair, structural and electronic system modifications on numerous carrier based aircraft.

The FRCMA Staff is located in Hangar 200. FRCMA also consists of five different sites: FRCMA Det Oceana, FRCMA Det Norfolk, FRCMA Det Patuxent River, Voyage Repair Team (VRT) Norfolk and Mayport, and FRCMA Aircraft Department (Oceana and Norfolk). These sites support the F/A-18, E-2, C-2, H-60, CH-46, AH-1, UH-1, EA-6B and H-53 aircraft/helicopters, ground support equipment, associated F-414, T-56, T-700, T-400, T-64 engine models, and ALRE.

== Innovation ==
A FRCMA sailor won Athena Project DC, a yearly competition to test the most innovative, time saving and cost saving projects to help the Navy's goals.

== See also ==
- Fleet Readiness Center East
- Fleet Readiness Center Northwest
- Fleet Readiness Center Southeast
- Fleet Readiness Center Southwest
- Fleet Readiness Center West
- Fleet Readiness Center Western Pacific
