= Fleet Readiness Center Northwest =

Coordinates: 48.3408°N 122.6669°W

- Active: 1959 - Present
- Branch: US Navy
- Size: 1,000
- Motto: Readiness is our Business
- Mascot: Tim Burr (Sasquatch)

Commanders
- Commanding Officer: CDR Daniel J. Hutton
- Executive Officer: CDR Jesse Whitfield
- Command Master Chief: CMDCM Danal J. Shaffer

Fleet Readiness Center Northwest (FRCNW) is located in Oak Harbor, Washington and is part of Naval Air Station Whidbey Island. Although originally named Aircraft Intermediate Maintenance Detachment and established in 1959, it was changed on October 10, 2008, and is a subsidiary of the Navy's Fleet Readiness Center Command.

== Responsibility ==
The command is tasked with supporting 13 EA-18G, 8 P-3/EP-3 squadrons, 11 aircraft carriers, and 1 C-40 squadron by maintaining and repairing equipment that is not suitable to complete at the organization level with the typical manning and capability. There are approximately 1,000 sailors assigned to various divisions within the command. While some serve to augment deploying units, most sailors serve at FRCNW on shore-duty tours.

=== Awards ===
Although not directly given to FRCNW, Naval Air Station Whidbey Island received first place for the Navy's annual Installation Excellence Award in 2016.

== Environmental stewardship ==
FRCNW is actively involved in the mission to reduce waste in accordance with direction promulgated by Naval leadership. In 2012, the command initiated a 'Green Team' - people responsible for managing the recycling and waste produced in their department. By doing so, the responsibility and initiative has influence throughout the command and generates more awareness by being compartmentalized. Since beginning their efforts, FRCNW has received multiple awards for their efforts to decrease the impact of the command on the local environment and identify ways to minimize energy and the resources necessary to complete their mission.

== See also ==
- Fleet Readiness Center East
- Fleet Readiness Center Mid-Atlantic
- Fleet Readiness Center Southeast
- Fleet Readiness Center Southwest
- Fleet Readiness Center West
- Fleet Readiness Center Western Pacific
