= Fleet Readiness Center Southwest =

Coordinates: 32.6978°N 117.2044°W

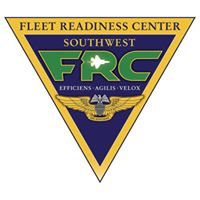
- Active: 1919 – present
- Branch: US Navy

Commanders
- Commanding Officer: CAPT Shannon Thompson
- Executive Officer: CAPT Jason Martinson
- Command Master Chief: CMDCM(AW/SW) David Sequira

Fleet Readiness Center Southwest (FRCSW) is an American naval aviation repair and maintenance facility based at the NAS North Island complex in San Diego, California.

== History ==
FRCSW was established in 1919 on NAS North Island CA. It was the U.S. Department of Defense's (at the time, the U.S. Department of War) first aviation maintenance and repair facility, making it the birthplace of U.S. naval aviation maintenance. The largest of six main Fleet Readiness Centers in the US Navy, it provides support to Navy and Marine Corps tactical, logistical and rotary wing aircraft and their components. It maintains field sites at Point Mugu, Camp Pendleton, MCAS Miramar, MCAS Yuma, MCAS Kaneohe Bay, NAS Whidbey Island, MCAS Futenma and MCAS Iwakuni.

== Personnel and mission ==
In 2023, FRCSW employed 4,172 people, 697 of whom were military.

Its mission statement is, "We generate readiness through timely and responsive production of engines, aircraft, and components for the warfighter."

== Products ==
FRCSW is the only Navy facility performing overhaul on General Electric LM2500 Marine Gas Turbine engines, which power a large number of the Navy's surface fleet including Spruance-Class, Aegis-Class, and Burke-Class surface warfare ships. It repairs and maintains the steam-powered catapults, arresting gear systems and landing guidance systems onboard Navy aircraft carriers. It has three 3-D printers capable of producing a variety of aircraft components, such as aircraft tailhooks, and covers to covers cracks found on F-18s.

== Past commanders ==
- Captain Shannon Thompson (April 2026 - Current)
- Captain Luis Rivera (May 2024 – April 2026)
- Captain Christopher Couch (January 2024 – May 2024)
- Captain Marc Farnsworth (July 2022 – January 2024)
- Captain Steve Leehe (May 2020 – July 2022)
- Captain Anthony Jaramillo (March 2018 – May 2020)
- Captain Craig Owen (August 2016 – March 2018)
- Captain Timothy H. Pfannenstein (August 2014 – August 2016)
- Captain Donald B. Simmons, III (April 2013 – August 2014)
- Captain John C. Smajdek (August 2011 – April 2013)
- Captain N. F. Melnick (August 2009 – August 2011)
- Captain Michael A. Kelly (January 2008 – August 2009)
- Captain F. E. Cleveland (March 2006 – January 2008)
- Captain W. T. Trainer (November 2004 – March 2006)
- Captain James G. Woolway (April 2003 – November 2004)
- Captain Peter J. Laszcz (November 2001 – April 2003)
- Captain Emory L. Chenoweth (May 2000 – November 2001)
- Captain Coleen A. Watry (October 1998 – May 2000)

== See also ==
- Fleet Readiness Center East
- Fleet Readiness Center Mid-Atlantic
- Fleet Readiness Center Northwest
- Fleet Readiness Center Southeast
- Fleet Readiness Center West
- Fleet Readiness Center Western Pacific
