= Fleet Readiness Center Western Pacific =

- Branch: US Navy

Commanders
- Commanding Officer: Commander Wilfred H. Judd III
- Executive Officer: Commander Gavin D. Guidry
- Command Master Chief: CMDSC Heidi MolinaBatista

Fleet Readiness Center Western Pacific (FRC WESTPAC) is an aircraft maintenance unit of the United States Navy. It is located at Naval Air Facility Atsugi, Japan. It is a subsidiary of the Navy's Commander, Fleet Readiness Center (COMFRC).

== History ==
Fleet Readiness Center Western Pacific (FRCWP) originated in the mid-1950s and was known as the Fleet Air Western Pacific Rework Activity (FAWPRA). On 1 October 1980 FAWPRA was renamed to Naval Air Pacific Repair Activity (NAPRA). And, on 1 October 2008, NAPRA was renamed to Fleet Readiness Center Western Pacific.

== Mission ==
To provide ready-for-tasking aircraft and aviation support equipment to U.S. Navy and Marine Corps Pacific Fleet forces, permanently sited in or deployed to Pacific Command (PACOM) and Central Command (CENTCOM) areas of responsibility by providing cost-effective organic and commercial depot-level rework, modification and repair of Naval Aviation weapon systems, support equipment and aeronautical components.

== Personnel ==
FRC WESTPAC’s approximately 200 personnel located at NAF Atsugi, MCAS Iwakuni, Busan Korea, and MCAS Futenma Okinawa continue to provide essential aviation depot services to fleet units ashore and afloat from the Northern Pacific westward to the Eastern United States.

== Past commanders ==
NAPRA

- Commander William M. Yerkes (10 October 1989 - 3 July 1990)
- Commander John R. Bramer (3 July 1990 - 9 June 1992)
- Commander Gary S. O'Neill (9 June 1992 - 17 December 1993)
- Commander Mark J. Swaney (17 December 1993 - 20 July 1995)
- Commander James A. Jones, Jr. (20 July 1995 - 4 January 1997)
- Commander Karl E. Yeakel (4 January 1997 - 23 June 1998)
- Commander John W. Scanlan II (23 June 1998 - 12 December 1999)
- Commander Dorothy J. Freer (14 December 1999- 29 June 2001)
- Commander Michael G. Berkin (29 June 2001 - 7 January 2003)
- Commander Richard J. Dorn (7 January 2003 – 8 July 2004)
- Commander Louis M. Borno, III (8 July 2004 – 6 October 2005)
- Commander Mark E. Mlikan (6 October 2005 – 26 March 2007)
- Commander Scott F. Adley (26 March 2007 – 5 December 2008)

FRC WESTPAC

- Commander Donald B. Simmons, III (5 December 2008 – 22 July 2010)
- Commander Charles M. Stuart (22 July 2010 – 14 December 2011)
- Commander Wesley Sanders (14 December 2011 – 11 July 2013)
- Commander Mark E. Nieto (11 July 2013 – 9 December 2014)
- Lieutenant Colonel Thomas Atkinson (9 December 2014 – 16 May 2016)
- Captain Matthew Edwards (16 May 2016 – 30 November 2017)
- Commander Steve Carmichael (30 November 2017 - 18 July 2019)
- Commander Randy J. Berti (18 July 2019 - 25 February 2021)
- Lieutenant Colonel Kevin M. Ryan (25 February 2021 - 15 June 2022)
- Commander Joseph M. Holt (15 June 2022 - 12 October 2023)
- Commander Wilfred H. Judd III (12 October 2023 - Present)

== See also ==
- Fleet Readiness Center East
- Fleet Readiness Center Mid-Atlantic
- Fleet Readiness Center Northwest
- Fleet Readiness Center Southeast
- Fleet Readiness Center Southwest
- Fleet Readiness Center West
