= Defense Contract Management Agency =

Agency in the US federal government

Agency overview
- Formed: 2000
- Headquarters: Fort Lee, Virginia, United States
- Employees: 9,526 civilian 542 military
- Annual budget: $1.54 billion
- Agency executive: VADM Stephen R. Tedford, Director
- Website: www.dcma.mil

The Defense Contract Management Agency (DCMA) is an agency of the United States federal government reporting to the under secretary of defense for acquisition and sustainment. It is responsible for administering contracts for the Department of Defense (DoD) and other authorized federal agencies. Its headquarters is located at Fort Lee, Virginia. DCMA also administers Foreign Military Sales contracts.

== Operations ==
DCMA provides specialized price and cost oversight to ensure that the government pays a fair and reasonable price for defense goods, particularly in non-competitive environments. This includes monitoring contractor compliance with the Truth in Negotiations Act (TINA), which mandates the certification of accurate, complete, and current cost or pricing data for sole-source contracts exceeding the statutory threshold. Under the National Defense Authorization Act for Fiscal Year 2026, the DCMA began implementing guidance to raise this mandatory disclosure threshold to $10 million for defense contracts entered into after June 30, 2026.

=== Aircraft Integrated Maintenance Operations ===
The Aircraft Integrated Maintenance Operations (AIMO) Command is part of DCMA, and it focuses on aircraft maintenance. It has operations in several U.S. locations, including Eglin Air Force Base in Florida; St. Augustine, Florida; Oklahoma City, Oklahoma; Greenville, South Carolina; and San Antonio, Texas.

It was established on August 10, 2003, replacing Southeast Aircraft Operations (SEAO), and became its own command in October 2020. The current commander of AIMO is Gabriel Hohner since March 2, 2023; the immediate prior commander was Jeffrey Carty (a resident of Meredith, New Hampshire), who had served starting in March 2020.

== History ==
Contract administration within DoD has been studied and modified for many years. In the early 1960s, a study was commissioned by the Secretary of Defense to examine the entire DoD contracting process. Known as "Project 60," the findings pointed to numerous benefits of consolidating contract administration and audit. At that time, each defense agency and military service was administering and auditing its own contracts, which resulted in a great amount of duplicate effort. Many of the contract administration responsibilities were eventually moved to the Defense Logistics Agency (DLA). However, the military services continued to retain oversight of the major weapon systems acquisition programs.

=== Defense Contract Management Command ===
The contract administration process was again reviewed in 1989. Citing continued problems with the manner in which the services were administering contracts, a Defense Management Review Decision (DMRD) 916 recommended the establishment of a joint command to administer defense contracts, to ensure that consistent policies and standards were applied to the defense acquisition process. Defense Contract Management Command (DCMC) was established as a command within the Defense Logistics Agency in February 1990 to satisfy the findings of DMRD 916.

=== DCMC transition to DCMA ===
On March 27, 2000, DCMC was renamed as the Defense Contract Management Agency and established independently from DLA. In DoD Directive 5105.64, the Deputy Secretary of Defense formally established the mission, responsibilities and functions of DCMA; save for 18 specific exceptions detailed in the Defense Federal Acquisition Regulation Supplement, DoD activities normally delegate a wide variety of contract administration functions to DCMA.

The DCMA headquarters moved from a northern Virginia location to Fort Lee, Virginia, as part of the federal 2005 Base Realignment and Closure process. The new headquarters was dedicated as Herbert Homer Hall on September 15, 2011. Homer was a DCMA employee killed in the September 11, 2001, terrorist attacks.

According to the DoD's Fiscal Year 2015 Budget Estimate, DCMA had 10,637 civilian and 472 military personnel, located in over 740 locations, managing over 19,000 contractors and nearly 350,000 active contracts. The operations and maintenance budget estimate for fiscal year 2015 was approximately $1.3 billion. By 2019, those numbers changed slightly. As of 14 January 2019, DCMA had 11,641 civilians and 552 military assigned. Number of contractors and number of active contracts remained roughly constant. Total contracts serviced were valued at $5.2 trillion and authorized contractor payments per day was valued at $678 million.

== DCMA seal, duty badge, and lapel pin ==
Defense Contract Management Agency seal

The DCMA Seal is pictured above. The eagle represents courage, honor, and dedicated service to the United States, represented by the shield of thirteen pieces. The thirteen pieces of the shield represent the original thirteen colonies that became the first thirteen states. The thirteen pieces are joined together by the blue chief, representing Congress. The eagle is clutching thirteen arrows and an olive branch with thirteen leaves and thirteen olives, similar to the Great Seal of the United States. The eagle is superimposed atop a map of the world, representing DCMA's global mission. The rays emanating from the center to the thirteen stars represent glory. The color blue matches the canton of the American flag and signifies vigilance, perseverance, and justice. The circle shape and blue color are also reminiscent of the official seal of the Department of Defense.

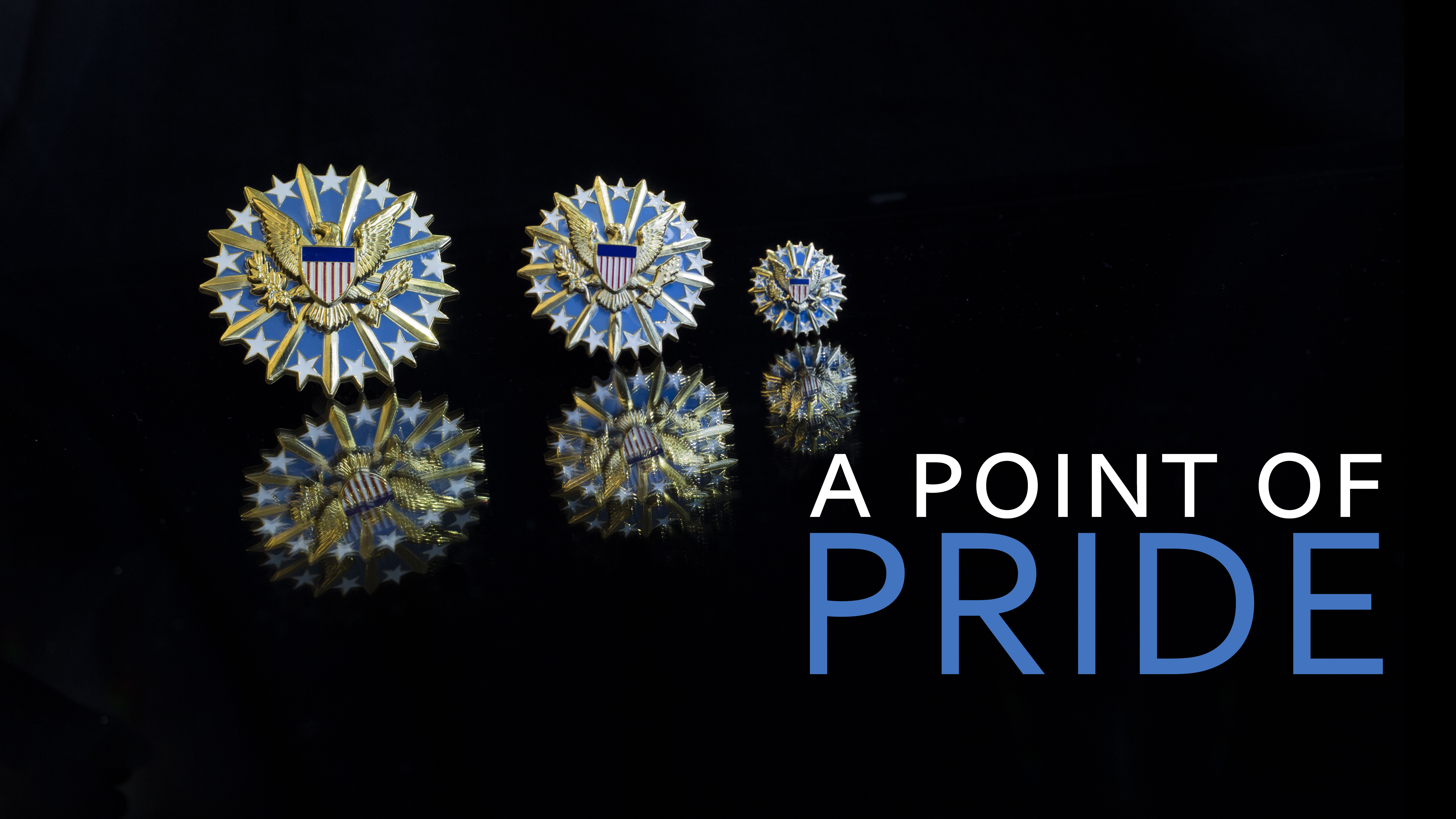
DCMA duty badges and lapel pin

In 2018, DCMA and the military services (the US Army, US Navy, US Air Force, and US Marine Corps—as the US Space Force did not exist in 2018) approved a duty badge for military personnel to wear while assigned to DCMA. A similar lapel pin version is also available for civilian employees (and military not in uniform). The badge and lapel pin were designed by The Institute Of Heraldry (TIOH), working at the direction of military officers assigned to DCMA. Those officers directed the badge and lapel pin be reminiscent of the DCMA Seal and they wrote the heraldry of the Seal (above) as part of the badge/pin approval process. Then-Director of DCMA, United States Air Force Lieutenant General Wendy M. Masiello approved the badge and pin for DCMA. Ultimately, TIOH approved the badge and pin as an official insignia for the US military and the individual Services approved the badge for wear on military uniforms.

== List of DCMA directors ==
No.	Director		Term			Service branch	Ref
No.	Portrait	Name	Took office	Left office	Term length	Service branch	Ref
1	Timothy P. Malishenko	Major General; Timothy P. Malishenko	March 2000	~April 1, 2001	~1 year, 17 days	U.S. Air Force	
2	Edward Harrington	Brigadier General; Edward Harrington	~April 1, 2001	2003	~3 years, 107 days	U.S. Army	
3	Darryl A. Scott	Major General; Darryl A. Scott	2003	January 2006	~2 years, 214 days	U.S. Air Force	
4	Keith Ernst	Keith Ernst	January 2006	May 5, 2008 (appointed Director February-May 2008)	~2 years, 121 days	Senior Executive; Service	
5	Charlie E. Williams Jr.	Charlie E. Williams Jr.	May 5, 2008	November 25, 2013	~5 years, 179 days	Senior Executive; Service	
–	James M. Russell	James M. Russell; Acting	November 25, 2013	June 6, 2014	193 days	Senior Executive; Service	
6	Wendy M. Masiello	Lieutenant General; Wendy M. Masiello	June 6, 2014	May 4, 2017	2 years, 332 days	U.S. Air Force	
7	David H. Lewis	Vice Admiral; David H. Lewis	May 4, 2017	June 4, 2020	3 years, 31 days	U.S. Navy	
8	David G. Bassett	Lieutenant General; David G. Bassett	June 4, 2020	December 20, 2023	3 years, 199 days	U.S. Army	
9	Gregory L. Masiello	Lieutenant General; Gregory L. Masiello	December 20, 2023	July 17, 2025	1 year, 209 days	U.S. Marine Corps	
–	Sonya I. Ebright	Sonya I. Ebright; Acting	July 17, 2025	December 11, 2025	147 days	Senior Executive; Service	
10	Stephen R. Tedford	Vice Admiral; Stephen R. Tedford	December 11, 2025	Incumbent	320 days	U.S. Navy	
