= Fleet Readiness Center Southeast =

Coordinates: 30.2230°N 81.6719°W

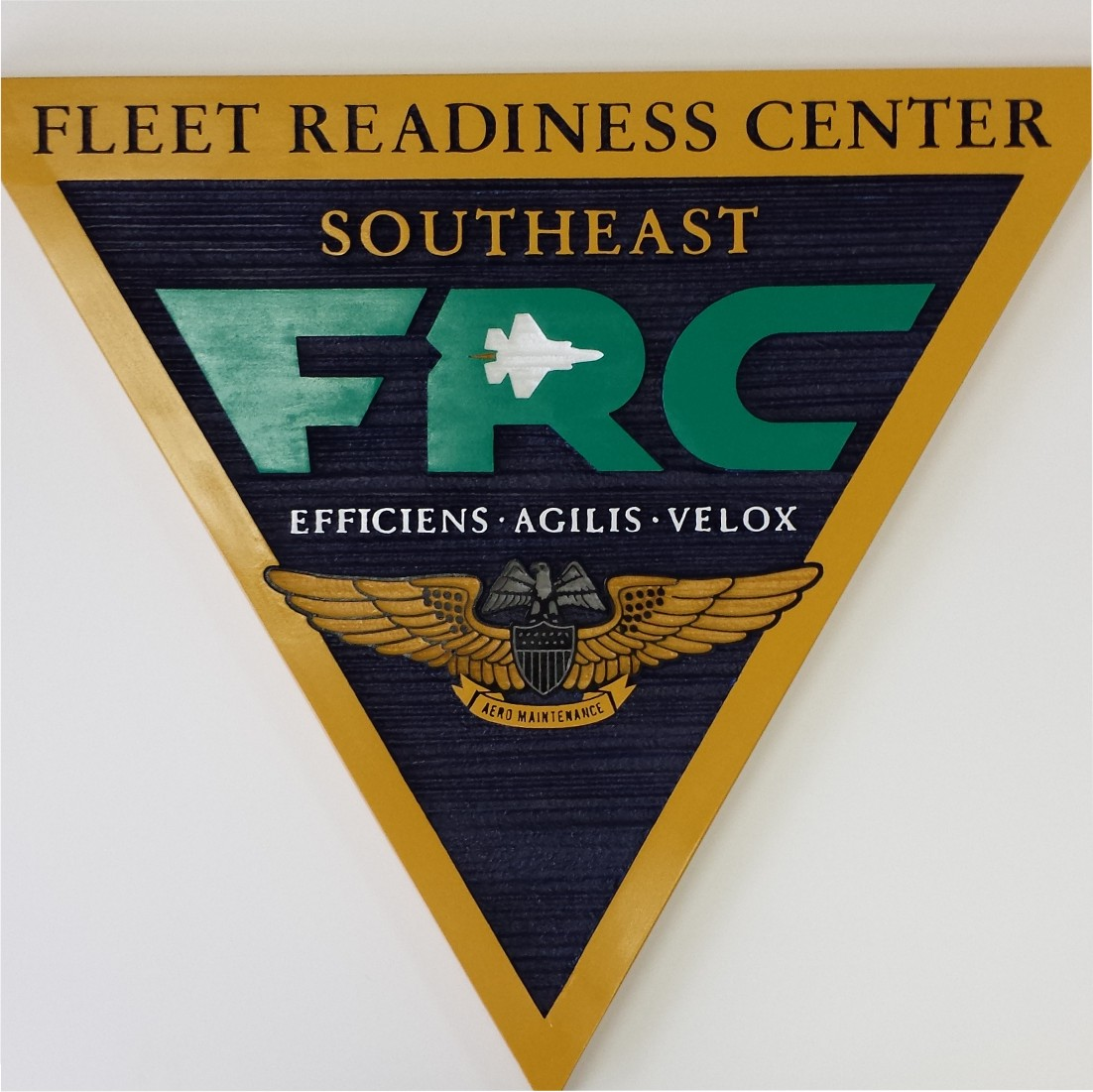
- Active: 1940 - Present
- Branch: U.S. Navy

Commanders
- Commanding Officer: CAPT Michael “Mike” Windom
- Executive Officer: CAPT Michael Freas
- Command Master Chief: CMDCM David Stauffer

Fleet Readiness Center Southeast is a U.S. Navy maintenance, repair and overhaul depot-level facility located onboard Naval Air Station Jacksonville with intermediate-level detachments at Naval Air Station Jacksonville, Naval Station Mayport and Naval Air Station Key West.

== About ==
Fleet Readiness Center Southeast (FRCSE) is Northeast Florida and Southeast Georgia's largest maintenance, repair, overhaul and technical services provider. With annual revenue exceeding $1 billion, the organization serves as an integral part of the greater U.S. Navy, Naval Air Systems Command, and Commander, Fleet Readiness Centers by maintaining the combat airpower for America's military forces. FRCSE works with several organizations such as the Defense Logistics Agency and Fleet Logistics Center Jacksonville to combat delays in the supply chain. In 2021, FRCSE held a change of command welcoming a new commanding officer, Capt. Grady Duffey and a new executive officer, Capt. William "Al" Palmer. In June 2021, FRCSE was recognized by the Florida Sterling Counsel and FloridaMakes as a finalist for the Florida Sterling Manufacturing Business Excellence (SMBE) Award.

== Personnel ==
FRCSE employs more than 5,000 civilian, military and contract workers.

== Past Commanding Officers ==
- Colonel Frederick Schenk (May 2019 - April 2021)
- Captain Trent DeMoss (July 2017 - May 2019)
- Captain Charles Stuart (July 2015 - July 2017)
- Captain John Kemna (July 2013 - July 2015)
- Captain Robert Caldwell (July 2011 - July 2013)
- Rear Admiral Paul Sohl (July 2009 - July 2011)
- Rear Admiral Timothy Matthews (August 2007 - July 2009)
- Captain John Scanlan (August 2005 - August 2007)
- Captain David Beck (July 2003 - August 2005)

== See also ==
- Fleet Readiness Center East
- Fleet Readiness Center Mid-Atlantic
- Fleet Readiness Center Northwest
- Fleet Readiness Center Southwest
- Fleet Readiness Center West
- Fleet Readiness Center Western Pacific
