= Paul Sohl =

US Navy Rear Admiral

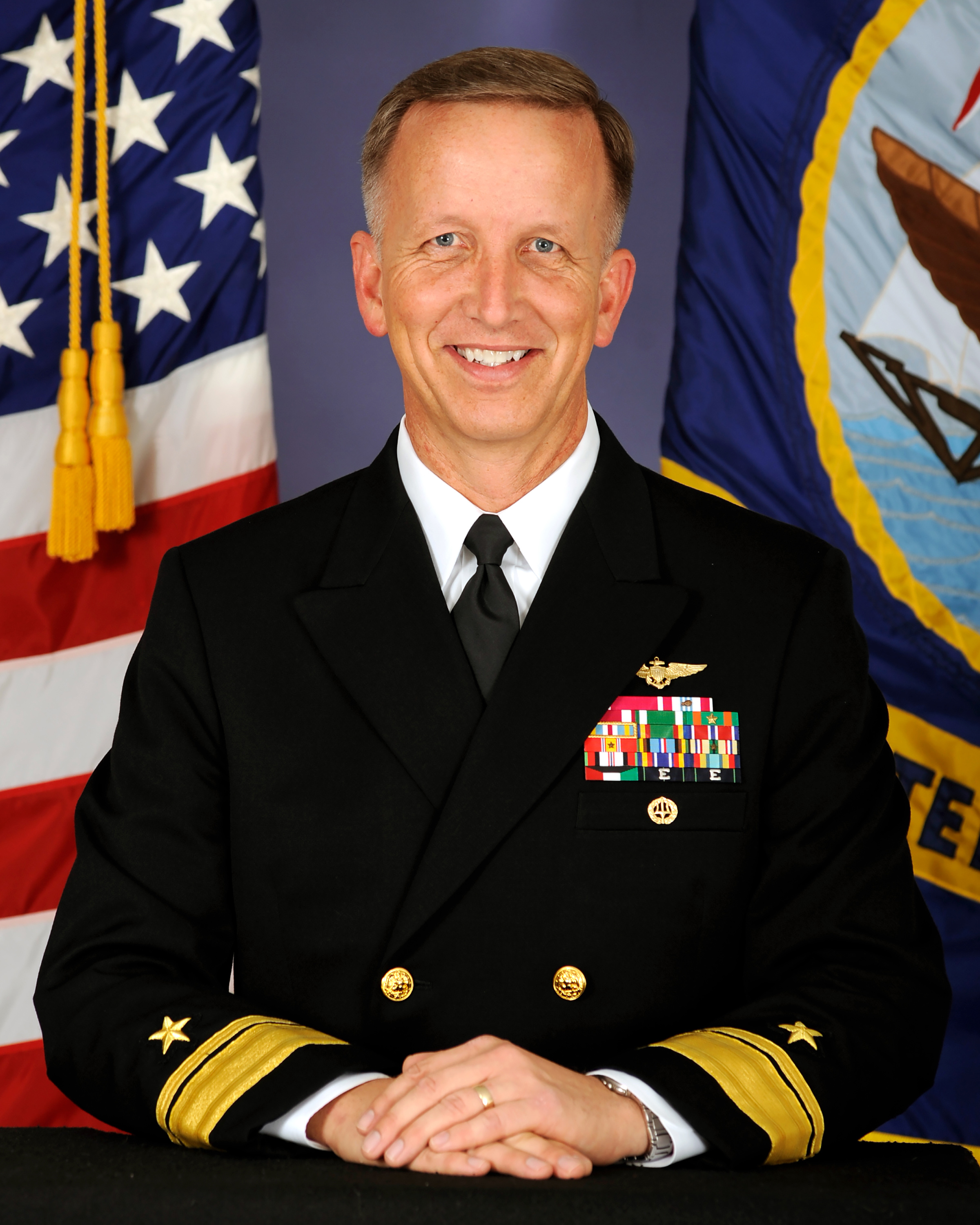
- Rear Admiral Paul A. Sohl in 2014
- Born: 1963 (age 62–63)
- Military career
- Allegiance: United States
- Branch: United States Navy
- Service years: 1986–2019
- Rank: Rear Admiral
- Commands: Operational Test and Evaluation Force; Fleet Readiness Center Southeast; United States Naval Test Pilot School
- Conflicts: Gulf War; War in Afghanistan
- Awards: Legion of Merit (3); Defense Meritorious Service Medal (2)

Paul Alan Sohl (born 1963) is a retired rear admiral in the United States Navy who served as Commander of the Operational Test and Evaluation Force.

== Early life ==
Sohl is originally from Waterloo, Iowa. He holds a Bachelor of Science in aeronautical engineering from the Massachusetts Institute of Technology and a Master of Science in aeronautical and astronautical engineering from Stanford University.

== Naval career ==
Sohl was commissioned an officer via the Naval Reserve Officers Training Corps and became a Naval Aviator in 1988. Following flight training and completion of the F/A-18C Fleet Replacement Squadron syllabus, he was assigned to Strike Fighter Squadron 113 (VFA-113), homeported at NAS Lemoore, California, during which time he was deployed during the Gulf War. In 1993, he graduated from the United States Naval Test Pilot School (USNTPS), a command in which he would later serve as the executive officer and commanding officer.

Laterally transferring from being an Unrestricted Line (URL) officer to the Restricted Line as an Aeronautical Engineering Duty Officer (AEDO), he later served as executive officer and commanding officer of Fleet Readiness Center Southeast (FRCSE) at NAS Jacksonville, Florida and Commander, Naval Test Wing Pacific. Other command positions Sohl has held include Commander of the Naval Air Warfare Center, Weapons Division and Commander, Fleet Readiness Centers (COMFRC). He has also been deployed to serve in Operation Enduring Freedom and was named Commander, Operational Test and Evaluation Force (COMOPTEVFOR) in 2016.

Awards Sohl has received various personal awards, to include multiple awards of the Legion of Merit, the Defense Meritorious Service Medal, and the Meritorious Service Medal.

== Business career ==
Paul Sohl is currently the Chief Executive Officer of The Florida High Tech Corridor.
