= Douglas W. Small =

American Navy admiral (born 1965)

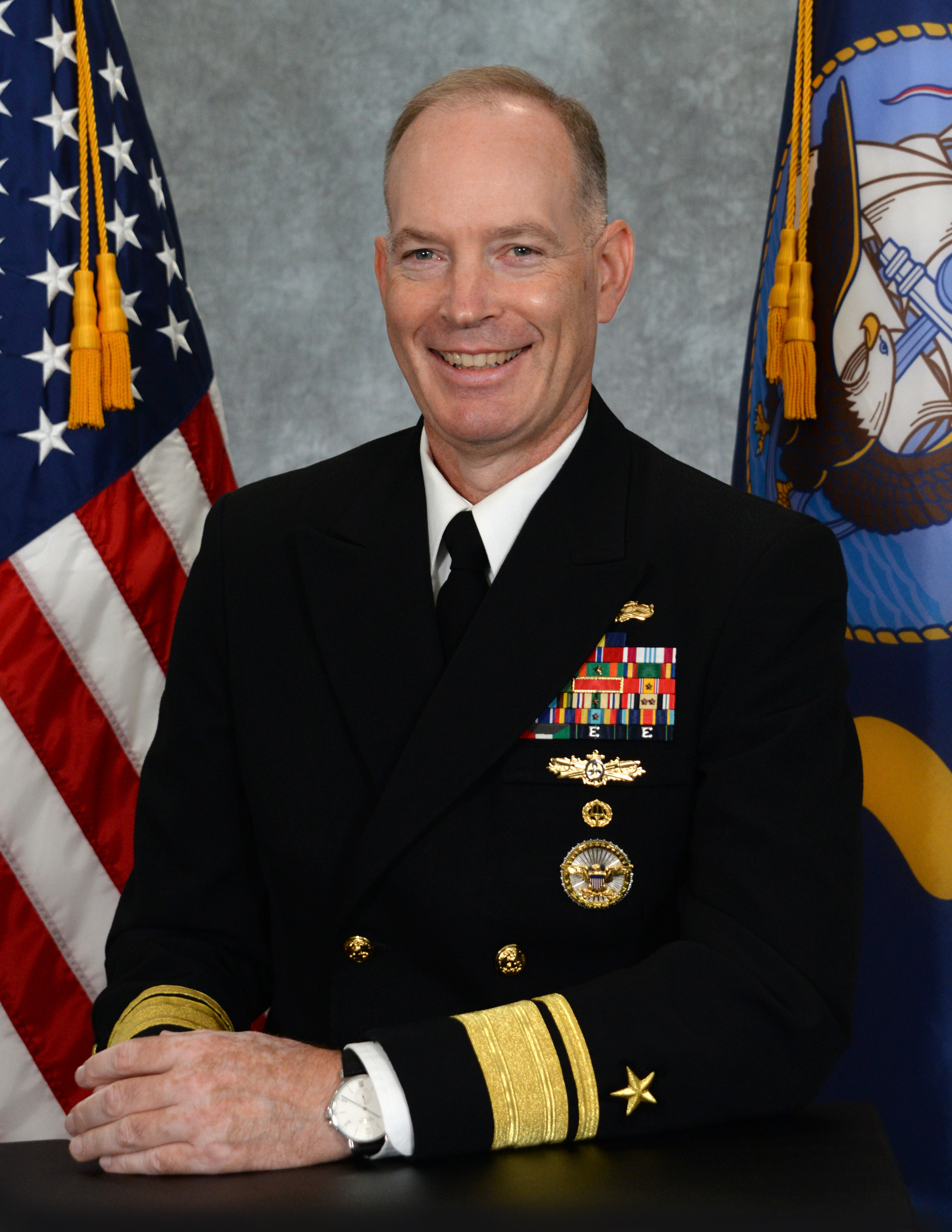
- Born: 1965 (age 60–61)
- Military career
- Allegiance: United States
- Branch: United States Navy
- Service years: 1988–2024
- Rank: Rear Admiral

Douglas William Small (born 1965) is a retired rear admiral and the former commander of Naval Information Warfare Systems Command.

== Career ==
A native of Birchwood, Wisconsin, Small served aboard the USS Camden (AOE-2) during the Gulf War. Other early assignment for Small include serving aboard the USS Iwo Jima (LHD-7), as well as with the Naval Surface Warfare Center Dahlgren Division and the Missile Defense Agency. During the Iraq War, he served with the Joint CREW Composite Squadron One. Eventually, Small was named executive assistant to Assistant Secretary of the Navy (Research, Development and Acquisition) Sean Stackley.

Small became program executive officer for integrated warfare systems in 2016.

== Awards ==
Small has received the Distinguished Service Medal, the Legion of Merit, the Bronze Star Medal, the Defense Meritorious Service Medal and the Army Meritorious Unit Commendation.

== Education ==
- Marquette University, B.S. in physics (1988)
- Naval Postgraduate School, Ph.D. in physics (1997)
