= Air Force Life Cycle Management Center =

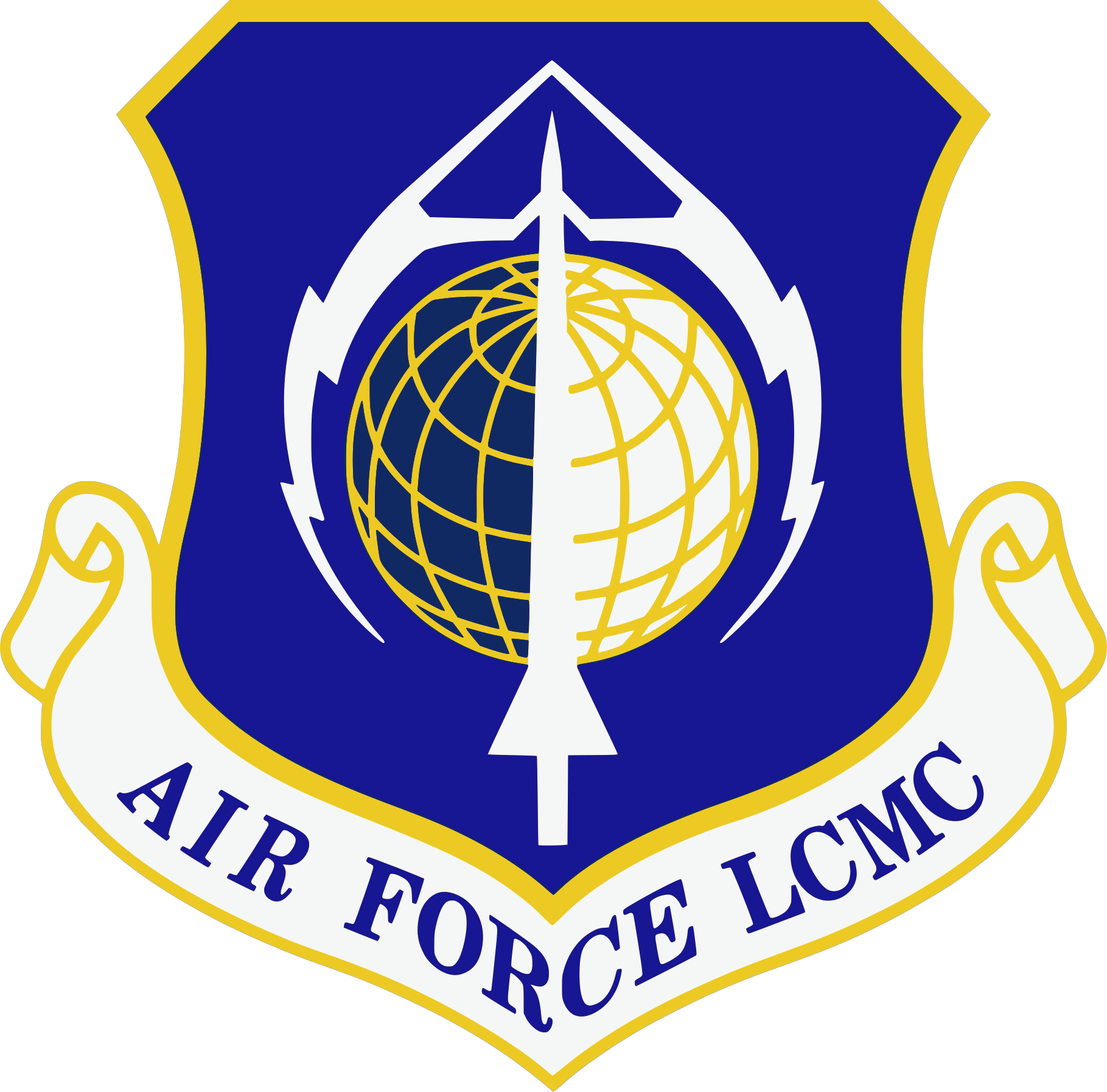
- Air Force Life Cycle Management Center emblem
- Active: 2012 – present
- Country: United States
- Branch: United States Air Force
- Garrison/HQ: Wright-Patterson Air Force Base
- Mottos: "Providing what warfighters need, when they need it!"

Commanders
- Commander: Lieutenant General Jason D. Voorheis
- Deputy Commander: Col Chadwick M. Steipp
- Command Chief Master Sergeant: CCMsgt Timothy J. Wieser
- Mobilization Assistant to the Commander: Brig Gen Christopher J. Hobbs

The Air Force Life Cycle Management Center (AFLCMC), headquartered at Wright-Patterson AFB, is one of six centers reporting to the Air Force Materiel Command. Led by a Lieutenant General, AFLCMC is charged with life cycle management of Air Force weapon systems from their inception to retirement. The AFLCMC mission is to acquire and support war-winning capabilities.

AFLCMC was designed to provide a single face and voice to customers, management of weapon systems across their life cycles, and to simplify and consolidate staff functions and processes to curtail redundancy and enhance efficiency. In addition, AFLCMC's operating structure provides a framework for decision making and process optimization across the weapon system life cycle. AFLCMC personnel work closely with their counterparts at the other AFMC centers.

== Organization ==
AFLCMC's portfolio includes: Information Technology systems and networks; Command, Control, Communications, Intelligence, Surveillance and Reconnaissance systems; Electronic Systems and Cyber & Networks at Hanscom Air Force Base; Weapons Directorate at Eglin Air Force Base; strategic systems; aerial platforms; and various specialized or supporting systems such as simulators or personal equipment. AFLCMC also executes sales of aircraft and other defense-related equipment while building relationships with foreign partner nation's air forces.

Each Program Office reports to a Portfolio Acquisition Executive (PAEs) who are accountable for the activities within their portfolio and who report to the Air Force Service Acquisition Executive at the Pentagon (Assistant Secretary of the Air Force for Acquisition).

AFLCMC execution directorates provide direct program support such as engineering, technical order management, developmental planning, contracting, and source selection assistance.

The 66th Air Base Group at Hanscom AFB, Mass., and the 88th Air Base Wing at Wright-Patterson AFB provide base operating support at those locations and also report to AFLCMC.

== List of commanders ==
No.	Commander		Term		
No.	Portrait	Name	Took office	Left office	Term length
1	C. D. Moore	Lieutenant General; C. D. Moore	9 July 2012	26 September 2014	2 years, 79 days
2	John F. Thompson	Lieutenant General; John F. Thompson	26 September 2014	2 May 2017	2 years, 218 days
3	Robert D. McMurry Jr.	Lieutenant General; Robert D. McMurry Jr.	2 May 2017	3 September 2020	3 years, 124 days
4	Shaun Morris	Lieutenant General; Shaun Morris	3 September 2020	6 November 2023	3 years, 64 days
-	Dennis L. D'Angelo	Dennis L. D'Angelo; Acting	6 November 2023	17 January 2024	72 days
5	Donna D. Shipton	Lieutenant General; Donna D. Shipton	17 January 2024	10 July 2026	2 years, 174 days
-	Dennis L. D'Angelo	Dennis L. D'Angelo; Acting	10 July 2026	26 August 2026	24 days
6	Jason D. Voorheis	Lieutenant General; Jason D. Voorheis	27 August 2026	Incumbent	4 days
