= General Hawkins =

General Hawkins may refer to:

- Hamilton S. Hawkins (1834–1910), U.S. Army major general
- Hamilton S. Hawkins III (1872–1950), U.S. Army brigadier general
- John Parker Hawkins (1830–1914), Union Army brigadier general and brevet major general
- Rush Hawkins (1831–1920), Union Army brevet brigadier general
- Stacey Hawkins (fl. 1990s–2020s), U.S. Air Force major general
