= Joseph S. Bleymaier =

United States Air Force general

Joseph S. Bleymaier Jr.
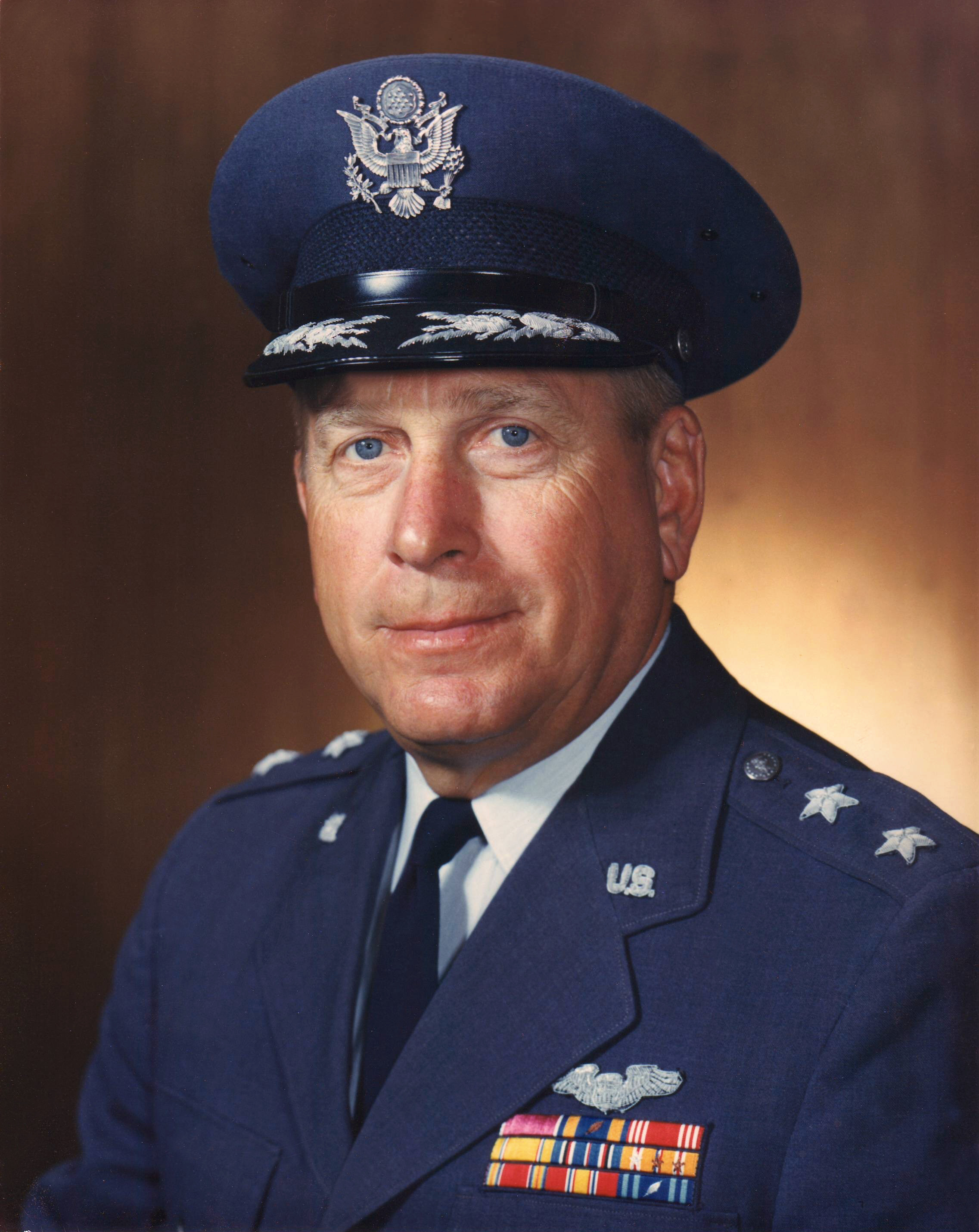
- Born: 31 December 1915; Austin, Texas, US
- Died: 10 October 1998 (aged 82)
- Burial place: Cloverdale Memorial Park, Boise, Idaho
- Relatives: Gene Bleymaier (son); Joe Bleymaier (grandson); Steven J. Bleymaier (grandson)
- Military career
- Allegiance: United States
- Branch: United States Army (1941–1947); United States Air Force (1947–1969)
- Service years: 1941–1969
- Rank: Major general
- Commands: Western Test Range
- Conflicts: World War II
- Awards: Legion of Merit; Air Medal (2)

Joseph Sylvester Bleymaier (31 December 1915 – 10 October 1998) was a major general in the United States Air Force (USAF). He enlisted in the United States Army Air Corps in 1941, and flew 25 combat missions in the Southwest Pacific Area during World War II.

As a senior officer with the Air Force Ballistic Missile Division in the late 1950s, he was responsible for the development and integration of propulsion, guidance and reentry vehicle subsystems of the Atlas, Titan and Minuteman intercontinental ballistic missiles. As deputy commander for launch vehicles of the Space Systems Division, he was responsible for the development of launch facilities for the military space program, and supported the National Aeronautics and Space Administration (NASA) Ranger program and Project Mercury, and the US Navy's Transit satellite navigation program.

In November 1961 he became the system program director of Air Force Program 624A (the Titan III) and 623A (Large Solid Motor Development), and deputy commander of the Space Systems Division for Manned Systems. He commanded of the Air Force Western Test Range from 1965 to 1967, when he became the Manned Orbiting Laboratory Systems Office in the Space and Missile Systems Organization (SAMSO).

== Early life ==
Joseph Sylvester Bleymaier was born in Austin, Texas, on 31 December 1915, the son of Jacob Bleymaier and his wife Mary Ann née Frish, two immigrants from Germany. Jacob was in charge of the athletic grounds at the University of Texas, from which Bleymaier received a Bachelor of Arts in business administration in 1937.

== World War II ==
In May 1941, Bleymaier enlisted in the United States Army Air Corps. He married Rosemary Matthias on 25 June 1941. They had five children: Joseph Jr., Marianne, Theodore, John and Eugene. He was commissioned as a second lieutenant on 23 May 1942. He attended Air Corps technical schools on armament, bombsight maintenance and power turret. From May 1942 to April 1943 he was with the 88th Bombardment Group at Walla Walla Army Air Base in Washington. He then served until November 1945 as an aerial gunnery officer with the 11th Bombardment Group in the Southwest Pacific Area, where he flew 25 combat missions totalling 147 combat hours in B-24 Liberator bombers. He was promoted to first lieutenant on 20 November 1942, captain on 1 September 1943, and major on 14 July 1945.

== Postwar ==
Alter the war Bleymaier returned to the United States, and briefly to the University Texas in June through August 1946. He then joined the 600th Air Force Base Unit at Eglin Air Force Base in Florida. He graduated from the Air Command and Staff College at Maxwell Air Force Base in Alabama in 1950. In August 1950 he became chief of the Wing Equipment Service Branch at United States Air Force (USAF) Headquarters at The Pentagon in Washington, DC, and from July 1952 to July 1953 was chief of the Equipment Branch of the Command Support Division there. He graduated from the Air War College at Maxwell Air Force Base in July 1954, and became chief of the Equipment Division of the Air Research and Development Command in Baltimore, Maryland. He graduated from the Air Resources Management Program at George Washington University in 1956, and in April 1957, he became the deputy director of the Air Research and Development Command's Directorate of Astronautics.

In October 1958, Bleymaier moved to the Air Force Ballistic Missile Division in Los Angeles, California, as head of its Subsystems Directorate. assistant for subsystems development. He became the Ballistic Missile Division's assistant commander for Subsystems in December 1958, and then its deputy commander for ballistic missiles in May 1959. In this capacity he was responsible for the development and integration of propulsion, guidance and reentry vehicle subsystems of the Atlas, Titan and Minuteman intercontinental ballistic missiles.

From April to November 1961, Bleymaier was deputy commander for launch vehicles of the Space Systems Division. He was responsible for the development of launch facilities for the military space program, and supported the National Aeronautics and Space Administration (NASA) Ranger program and Project Mercury, and the US Navy's Transit satellite navigation program. In November 1961 he became the system program director of Air Force Program 624A (the Titan III) and 623A (Large Solid Motor Development), and deputy commander of the Space Systems Division for Manned Systems. he this role he was cited by President Lyndon B. Johnson for his contributions to the 1965 Defense Cost Reduction Program, and the Secretary of Defense, Robert S. McNamara, described the Manned Systems program as the "best managed program in the Department of Defense."

Bleymaier became the commander of the Air Force Western Test Range in October 1965, with his headquarters at Vandenberg Air Force Base in California. In this role he was responsible for the support of the NASA and USAF projects using the range. On 1 July 1967, he became head of the Manned Orbiting Laboratory Systems Office in the Space and Missile Systems Organization (SAMSO). He retired from the USAF in 1969. His decorations included the Legion of Merit, and the Air Medal with an oak leaf cluster.

== Later life ==
After retiring from the USAF, Bleymaier worked for Morrison–Knudsen, headquartered in Boise, Idaho. As head of the US offices of the Morrison–Knudsen Saudi-Arabia Consortium, he oversaw construction of facilities at King Khalid Military City in Saudi Arabia. He died on 10 October 1998, and was buried in Cloverdale Memorial Park in Boise.

== Personal ==
His son Joseph Jr. attended the U.S. Air Force Academy, graduated in 1965, became a fighter pilot, and retired as a colonel. His grandson, Steven J. Bleymaier, also attended the Air Force Academy, graduating in 1991, and retired as a brigadier general in 2019.

Youngest son Gene was a collegiate athletic director at Boise State and San Jose State, best known for installing the first blue AstroTurf at BSU's Bronco Stadium in 1986. He played college football at UCLA as a tight end (1972–1974), and graduated from law school at Loyola Marymount in 1978.

== Dates of rank ==
Insignia	Rank	Component	Date	Reference
	Second lieutenant	Air Corps	23 May 1942	
	First lieutenant (temporary)	Army of the United States	20 November 1942	
	Captain (temporary)	Army of the United States	1 September 1943	
	Major (temporary)	Army of the United States	14 July 1945	
	First lieutenant	Air Corps	12 July 1946	
	Major	United States Air Force	3 September 1948	
	Lieutenant colonel	United States Air Force	15 March 1949	
	Colonel (temporary)	United States Air Force	15 August 1951	
	Colonel	United States Air Force	11 April 1957	
	Brigadier general (temporary)	United States Air Force	16 May 1963	
	Major general	United States Air Force	April 1967	
