= Gene Bleymaier =

American university administrator

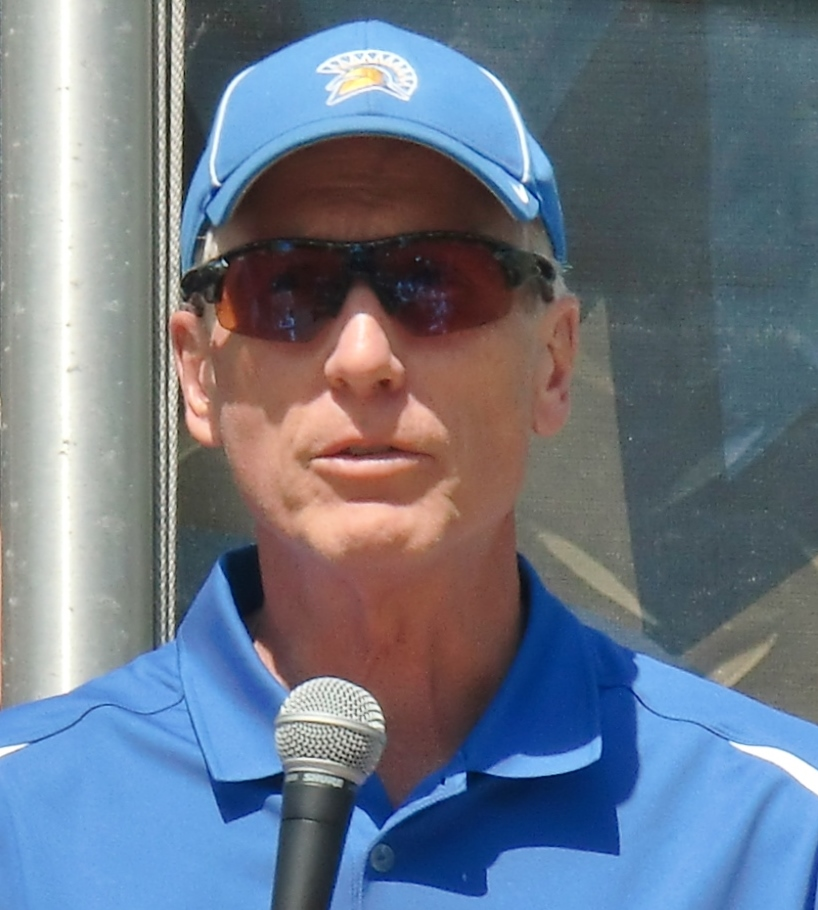
- Bleymaier in 2015

Biographical details
- Born: 1953 (age 72–73)
- Education: UCLA (1975); Loyola Law School (1978)

Playing career
- 1972–1974: UCLA
- Position: Tight end

Administrative career (AD unless noted)
- 1976–1981: UCLA (asst. AD)
- 1981–1982: Boise State (asst. AD)
- 1982–2011: Boise State
- 2012–2017: San Jose State
- 2017: San Jose State (special advisor)

Accomplishments and honors

Awards
- As athletic director: Astro Turf A.D. of the Year (2008); Bobby Dodd A.D. of the Year (2011); As player: Third-team All-Pac-8 (1974)

Eugene Anthony Bleymaier (born c. 1953) is an American university administrator who was most recently special advisor to the president at San Jose State University. Bleymaier was previously an athletic director, first at Boise State University from 1982 to 2011 and San Jose State from 2012 to 2017.

== Early life and education ==
The youngest of four children, Bleymaier was raised a military brat; his father Joseph was a major general in the U.S. Air Force. Upon retirement from active duty, Joseph worked for Morrison–Knudsen, headquartered in Boise, Idaho.

Bleymaier attended Borah High School in Boise and played football for the Lions under head coach De Pankratz on undefeated state championship teams (the win streak ended in October 1971 at 34 games). After graduation in 1971, he attended the University of California, Los Angeles (UCLA) and lettered in football for the Bruins from 1972 to 1974. A tight end, Bleymaier played under head coach Pepper Rodgers for his first two seasons; as a senior under new head coach Dick Vermeil in 1974, Bleymaier made 13 catches for 245 yards and one touchdown and was third-team All-Pac-8.

Bleymaier graduated from UCLA in 1975 with a bachelor's degree in sociology and was named "outstanding senior" by the UCLA Alumni Association. He then attended Loyola Law School and graduated with a J.D. in 1978.

== Administrative career ==
=== UCLA (1976–1981) ===
Bleymaier became assistant athletic director at UCLA in 1976, while attending law school, and supervised academic affairs for student-athletes, including financial aid and tutoring.

=== Boise State (1981–2011) ===
In June 1981, Boise State University hired Bleymaier as assistant athletic director; longtime athletic director Lyle Smith had recently retired and Mike Mullally of Cal State Fullerton succeeded him. After a flap with boosters over new season ticket premiums, Mullally resigned after less than a year in Boise and Bleymaier was promoted to athletic director by university president John Keiser in March 1982.

At Boise State, Bleymaier oversaw three conference changes. In 1996, Boise State moved from the Big Sky Conference to the Big West Conference, followed by the Western Athletic Conference (WAC) in 2001 and Mountain West Conference (MWC) in 2011. As a member of the WAC, Boise State won 32 conference championships, including eight in football. Throughout the 2000s, Boise State was a Top 100 contender for the Learfield Sports Director's Cup, a national award for the most successful college athletics department.

The football program moved up to Division I-A in 1996 and rose to a national brand under head coaches Dirk Koetter (1998–2000), Dan Hawkins (2001–2005), and Chris Petersen (2006–2013). In Petersen's first season in 2006, the Broncos were undefeated (13–0), upset the Oklahoma Sooners in the Fiesta Bowl, and were fifth in the final AP Poll. The 2009 team also was undefeated (14–0) and were fourth in the final AP Poll, the highest in school history. Boise State coaches also earned 31 "Coach of the Year" honors in the 2000s.

Bleymaier was responsible for the trademark blue turf at Bronco Stadium, introduced 40 years ago in 1986. In 1997, he established the Humanitarian Bowl (now the Famous Idaho Potato Bowl) football game hosted by Boise State.

On August 11, 2011, BSU president Bob Kustra fired Bleymaier, following an NCAA investigation involving 22 rules violations by the Boise State women's tennis, men's tennis, track and field, and football programs. The following month, the NCAA placed Boise State on three years of probation and reduced football scholarships, among other sanctions. Bleymaier had served thirty years at the university, 29 as athletic director.

=== San Jose State (2012–2017) ===
In May 2012, San Jose State University president Mohammad Qayoumi hired Bleymaier as the university's new athletic director effective June 30; Bleymaier was the only candidate interviewed. At San Jose State, Bleymaier led the athletics department's move from the WAC to MWC and addition of new women's sports, sand volleyball and indoor and outdoor track. Additionally, Bleymaier has overseen fundraising for the proposed Vermeil-Walsh Athletic Center, to be constructed at the north end zone of Spartan Stadium. Bleymaier has also set a goal to upgrade facilities for baseball, softball, soccer, golf, tennis, and track.

In the 2012–13 academic year, his first as athletic director, San Jose State experienced a very successful year, with football at 11–2 and were ranked in the final AP and BCS rankings for the first time in school history. It marked the football team's first 11-win season since 1940 and best record since a 10–2 season in 1987. The women's swimming, women's tennis, and softball teams all won WAC titles. These achievements led San Jose State to be ranked a historically high 106th of 295 NCAA Division I programs in the 2013 final Learfield Sports Director's Cup rankings. In September 2012, Bleymaier hired Dave Nakama as baseball head coach, following the retirement of Sam Piraro.

That first year, Bleymaier also hired several head coaches who began their tenures in the 2013–14 school year. In December 2012, after head football coach Mike MacIntyre left for Colorado, Bleymaier hired UCLA alum and University of San Diego head coach Ron Caragher as head coach. In March 2013, Bleymaier fired men's basketball head coach George Nessman and hired Boise State assistant coach Dave Wojcik to replace Nessman.

Under Caragher, San Jose State football went 6–6 in 2013 and 3–9 in 2014. Under Wojcik, men's basketball went 7–24 in 2013–14, then 2–28 in 2014–15. Baseball has gone 49–122 (.287) under Nakama, including a last-place finish in the Mountain West in 2015.

In September 2013, following the surprise resignation of women's basketball head coach Tim La Kose, Bleymaier hired Sacramento State head coach Jamie Craighead. Under Craighead, the Spartans improved from 11–19 in 2013–14 to 15–17 in 2014–15, including a run to the semifinals of the 2015 Mountain West Tournament that followed an upset of #1 seed Colorado State.

Following the retirement of women's volleyball head coach Oscar Crespo after the 2013 season, Bleymaier hired Jolene Shepardson of Cal State Bakersfield in January 2014.

In 2017, Bleymaier was reassigned in February as special advisor to SJSU president Mary Papazian, focusing on South Campus athletic facility renovations. Bleymaier's deputy Marie Tuite became interim athletic director, pending a national search for a long-term replacement.
