= Jeramiah Dickey =

American university athletics director

Current position
- Title: Director of Athletics
- Team: Boise State Broncos
- Conference: Pac-12

Biographical details
- Education: Texas (2004)

Administrative career (AD unless noted)
- 2003–2006: UTEP (asst. AD)
- 2007–2010: Akron (asst. AD)
- 2012–2017: Houston (asst. AD)
- 2017–2021: Baylor (Deputy AD)
- 2021–present: Boise State

Accomplishments and honors

Awards
- As athletic director: NACDA A.D. of the Year (2025); 2025 Sports Business Journal AD of the Year (2025)

Jeramiah Dickey (born c. 1982) is an American university administrator who is the Director of Athletics at Boise State University, with oversight over the Broncos American football program.

== Administrative career ==
=== Early career ===
After graduating from the University of Texas at Austin, Dickey served in a variety of roles for the University of Texas at El Paso athletics department, including Assistant Director for Athletics Development, Assistant Director of Marketing and Promotions, and Marketing and Promotions Assistant from 2003 to 2006. He then spent three years at Akron before returning to Texas and joining the athletic department at Houston.

Following Houston, he rose to the Associate Vice President of Intercollegiate Athletics role at Baylor from 2018 to 2020.

=== Boise State (2021–present) ===
Dickey was named Director of Athletics at Boise State University on January 2, 2021. He has been instrumental in the success and growth of the football program, which reached the College Football Playoff in 2024, and led the charge for the Broncos to join the Pac-12 Conference in 2026. On January 8, 2025, Boise State announced a contract extension for Dickey after interest from other schools.

== Personal life ==
Dickey is married to Elizabeth and has two sons and a daughter. He was born in El Paso, Texas.
