= Northern Illinois Huskies wrestling =

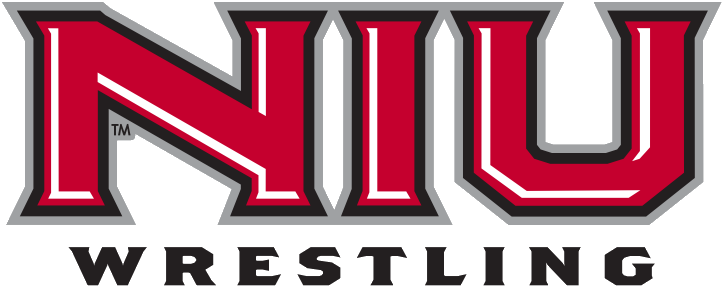
- Founded: 1931
- University: Northern Illinois University
- Head coach: Ryan Ludwig (12th season)
- Conference: MAC
- Location: DeKalb, IL
- Arena: NIU Convocation Center (capacity: 10,000)
- Nickname: Huskies
- Colors: Cardinal and black
- Fight song: Huskie Fight Song

Conference Tournament championships
- 1985 (MAC)

The Northern Illinois Huskies wrestling team represents Northern Illinois University (NIU) in DeKalb, Illinois. NIU wrestling started competing in 1931 and currently competes in the Mid-American Conference (MAC). NIU wrestling has produced two NCAA Champions, three NAIA Champions, and currently holds a 51-year streak (1972–present) of sending at least one NCAA qualifier to the NCAA Division I Wrestling Championships. The Huskies are coached by Ryan Ludwig.

== Conference membership history (Division I only) ==
- 1975–1987, 1997–2026: Mid-American Conference
- 1988–1996: Independent
- 2027–future: Pac-12 Conference

== Championships ==
=== Conference Championships ===
- 1985 – Mid-American Conference (MAC) Championship.

=== Individual NCAA National Champions ===
Year	Name	Weight Class
1960	Roy Conrad	177
1965	Neal McDonald	HWT

=== Individual NAIA National Champions ===
Year	Name	Weight Class
1958	Dale Tessler	177
1961	Ray Guzak	167
1961	Roy Conrad	177

=== Individual Conference Champions ===
Year	Name	Weight Class	Conference
1975	Mark Tiffany	190	MAC
1976	Tony Flippo	142	MAC
1977	Scott Soderholm	134	MAC
1977	Phil Gulsvig	177	MAC
1977	Mark Tiffany	190	MAC
1977	Dean Schultz	HWT	MAC
1979	Dave Larimer	126	MAC
1979	Mike Pheanis	158	MAC
1981	Mike Pheanis	158	MAC
1982	Gene Vatch	158	MAC
1983	Ernie Vatch	167	MAC
1984	Bruce Swierczewski	142	MAC
1984	Gene Vatch	158	MAC
1985	Nate Allison	126	MAC
1985	Bruce Swierczewski	142	MAC
1985	Gene Vatch	158	MAC
1985	John Major	177	MAC
1997	Jeremy Goeden	190	MAC
1998	Jeremy Goeden	190	MAC

Year	Name	Weight Class	Conference
2000	Dave Potter	184	MAC
2001	Scott Owen	157	MAC
2002	Scott Owen	157	MAC
2002	Bill Lowney	174	MAC
2002	Ben Heizer	184	MAC
2003	Sam Hiatt	133	MAC
2003	Scott Owen	157	MAC
2003	Ben Heizer	184	MAC
2004	Sam Hiatt	133	MAC
2004	Ben Heizer	184	MAC
2005	Josh Wooton	141	MAC
2006	Josh Wooton	141	MAC
2006	Johnny Galloway	165	MAC
2007	Pat Castillo	125	MAC
2008	Pat Castillo	133	MAC
2008	Pat McLeMore	141	MAC
2009	Bryan Deutsch	157	MAC
2011	Brad Dieckhaus	184	MAC
2012	Austin Eicher	133	MAC
2020	Brit Wilson	184	MAC
2021	Brit Wilson	184	MAC

== NCAA Wrestling Championships qualifiers ==
NIU has sent 123 wrestlers to the NCAA Division I Wrestling Championships, including a current 54-year streak of sending at least one qualifier.

Year	Name	Weight Class
1960	Roy Conrad	177
1969	Wes Caine	123
1972	Larry Johnson	158
1973	Johnny Johnson	190
1974	Larry Johnson	150
1975	Lonnie Parker	126
1975	Mark Tiffany	190
1976	Scott Soderholm	134
1976	Tony Flippo	142
1976	Dan Fiorini	167
1976	Mark Tiffany	190
1977	Scott Soderholm	134
1977	Phil Gulsvig	177
1977	Mark Tiffany	190
1977	Dean Schultz	HWT
1978	Lonnie Parker	126
1978	Ken Kraft	142
1979	Dave Larimer	126
1979	Mike Pheanis	158
1980	Dan Fiorini	167
1981	Mark Verr	118
1981	Mike Pheanis	158
1982	Gene Vatch	158
1983	Gene Vatch	158
1983	Ernie Vatch	167
1983	Joe Morrow	177
1984	Bruce Swierczewski	142
1984	Gene Vatch	158
1985	Nate Allison	126
1985	Phil Rembert	134
1985	Bruce Swierczewski	142
1985	Gene Vatch	158
1985	Ernie Vatch	167
1985	John Major	177
1986	Nate Allison	134
1986	Mike Green	158
1986	John Major	177
1987	Tino Gonzalez	126
1987	Nate Allison	142
1988	Anton Kossakowski	177
1989	Anton Kossakowski	177
1990	T.C. Dantzler	158
1990	Joe Madonia	177
1991	T.C. Dantzler	158
1992	T.C. Dantzler	158
1993	T.C. Dantzler	158
1993	Jim Kossakowski	167
1994	Shannon Gregory	118
1994	Jason Solomon	126
1994	James Spillman	150
1995	Jason Solomon	126
1995	Ben Lehrfeld	177
1995	Demond Rodez	190
1996	Jason Solomon	134
1996	Demond Rodez	190

Year	Name	Weight Class
1997	Jeremy Goeden	190
1998	Ryan Egan	126
1998	Jeremy Goeden	190
1999	Ryan Egan	133
1999	Scott Owen	141
2000	Alexis Rivera	125
2000	Tom LeCuyer	141
2000	David Potter	184
2001	Ryan Egan	141
2001	Scott Owen	157
2002	Marlon Felton	125
2002	Scott Owen	157
2002	Bill Lowney	174
2002	Ben Heizer	184
2003	Sam Hiatt	133
2003	Josh Wooton	141
2003	Scott Owen	157
2003	Ben Heizer	184
2004	Sam Hiatt	133
2004	Josh Wooton	149
2004	Ben Heizer	184
2005	Sam Hiatt	133
2005	Josh Wooton	141
2005	Mike Grimes	149
2005	Johnny Galloway	165
2006	Pat Castillo	125
2006	Josh Wooton	141
2006	Johnny Galloway	165
2007	Pat Castillo	125
2007	Johnny Galloway	165
2007	Danny Burk	174
2007	Duke Burk	184
2008	Pat Castillo	133
2008	Pat McLemore	141
2008	Duke Burk	174
2009	Tristen DaShazer	133
2009	Bryan Deutsch	157
2010	Bryan Deutsch	157
2011	Bryan Deutsch	157
2011	Brad Dieckhaus	184
2012	Kevin Fanta	141
2012	Brad Dieckhaus	184
2013	Matt Mougin	174
2014	Nick Smith	133
2014	Rob Jillard	149
2015	Shawn Scott	197
2016	Austin Eicher	133
2016	Steve Bleise	141
2016	Andrew Morse	157
2016	Shawn Scott	197
2017	Brock Hudkins	125
2017	Steve Bleise	149
2017	Shaun'Qae McMurtry	165
2017	Trace Engelkes	174
2017	Shawn Scott	197
2018	Brock Hudkins	125
2018	Bryce Gorman	184
2019	Bryce West	125
2019	Brit Wilson	174
2020	Gage Braun	197
2020	Max Ihry	285
2020	Izzak Olejnik	165
2020	Brit Wilson	184
2021	Anthony Cheloni	149
2021	Mason Kauffman	174
2021	Izzak Olejnik	165
2021	Bryce West	133
2021	Brit Wilson	184
2022	Izzak Olejnik	165
2022	Brit Wilson	184
2022	Mason Kauffman	174
2023	Izzak Olejnik	165
2024	Blake West	125
2025	Blake West	125
2025	Markel Baker	133
2025	Landen Johnson	157

== All-Americans ==
NIU wrestling has had 16 All-Americans in program history.

Year	Name	Weight Class
1961	Bill Kontos	130
1964	Mel Schmidt	177
1965	Bob Furlan	147
1965	Mel Schmidt	177
1966	Bob Furlan	147
1969	Wes Caine	123
1972	Larry Johnson	158
1973	Johnny Johnson	190
1975	Mark Tiffany	190
1997	Jeremy Goeden	190
1998	Jeremy Goeden	190
2002	Scott Owen	157
2003	Scott Owen	157
2003	Ben Heizer	184
2004	Ben Heizer	184
2021	Brit Wilson	184

== Coaching staff ==
NIU wrestling head coach Ryan Ludwig, who took over the position starting in the 2011–12 season, is a three-time NAIA All-American and a national finalist at 157 pounds.

- Ryan Ludwig – Head Coach
- Dominick Moyer – Assistant Coach
- Ty Prazma – Assistant Coach

== See also ==
- National Wrestling Hall of Fame and Museum
