= Ogden Air Logistics Complex =

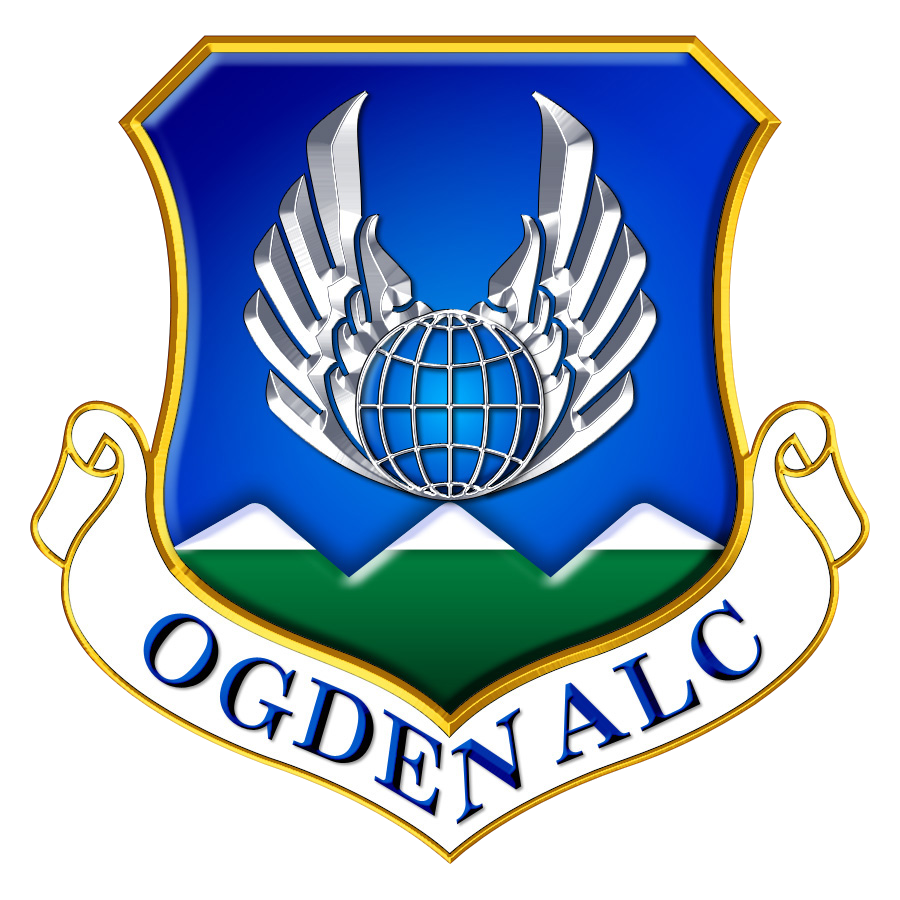
- Complex badge
- Active: 1943–present
- Country: United States
- Branch: United States Air Force
- Type: Air Logistics Complex
- Role: Logistics, support, maintenance and distribution
- Size: 8,100 personnel
- Part of: Air Force Sustainment Center
- Headquarters: Hill Air Force Base, Utah

Commanders
- Current commander: Major General Kenyon Bell

The Ogden Air Logistics Complex (OO-ALC) performs programmed depot maintenance on a number of US Air Force weapon systems. Specifically it supports A-10 Thunderbolt II, B-2 Spirit, F-16 Fighting Falcon, and LGM-30G Minuteman III systems. Additionally, the center is responsible for landing gear systems, conventional munitions, solid propellants, and composite materials. It is located at Hill Air Force Base.

The former Ogden Air Logistics Center was re-designated as the Ogden Air Logistics Complex on 12 July 2012.

Since 2012 the Complex has supervised the 309th Aerospace Maintenance and Regeneration Group at Davis-Monthan Air Force Base.

== Lineage ==
- Established as Ogden Air Depot Control Area Command on 19 January 1943. Activated on 1 February 1943.
- Redesignated:

Ogden Air Service Command on 17 May 1943;
Ogden Air Technical Service Command on 14 November 1944;
Ogden Air Materiel Area on 2 July 1946;
Ogden Air Logistics Center on 1 April 1974;
Ogden Air Logistics Complex, 12 July 2012.

== List of commanders ==
- Maj. Gen. Edmund A. Rafalko (July 1974–)
- Gen. Stephen P. "Pat" Condon (November 1994–August 1997)
- Maj. Gen. Richard H. Roellig (August 1997–January 2000)
- Maj. Gen. Scott C. Bergren (January 2000–July 2003)
- Maj. Gen. Kevin Sullivan (July 2003–July 2007)
- Brig. Gen. Kathleen D. Close (June 2007–July 2009)
- Brig. Gen. H. Brent Baker (July 2012–September 2014)
- Brig. Gen. Steven Bleymaier (August 2015–August 2017)
- Brig. Gen. Stacey Hawkins (August 2017–July 2019)
- Brig. Gen. C. McCauley von Hoffman (July 2019–July 2021)
- Brig. Gen. Richard W. Gibbs (July 2021–August 2023)
- Brig. Gen. Kenyon Bell (August 2023–August 2025)
- Brig. Gen. G. Hall Sebren Jr. (January 2026–Present)
