= Mike Mullally =

American college athletics administrator (1939–2021)

Biographical details
- Born: April 29, 1939; Pierre, South Dakota, U.S.
- Died: July 15, 2021 (aged 82); Paris, Illinois, U.S.

Administrative career (AD unless noted)
- 1974–1979: Eastern Illinois
- 1979–1981: Cal State Fullerton
- 1981–1982: Boise State

E. Michael Mullally (April 29, 1939 – July 15, 2021) was an American college athletics administrator. He was the athletic director at Eastern Illinois University (1974–1979), California State University, Fullerton (1979–1981), and Boise State University (1981–1982).

At Boise State, Mullally succeeded longtime athletic director Lyle Smith in the summer of 1981. Less than a year later, Mullally resigned in March 1982 following criticism of his proposed ticketing policy for the school's football and basketball games. Assistant athletic director Gene Bleymaier was promoted by university president John Keiser and held the post for more than 29 years.

Mullally owned several Checkers drive-in restaurants in the Kansas City area in the 1990s; by 2001 he had retired to Florida.
