= Stacey Hawkins =

U.S. Air Force general

Stacey T. Hawkins
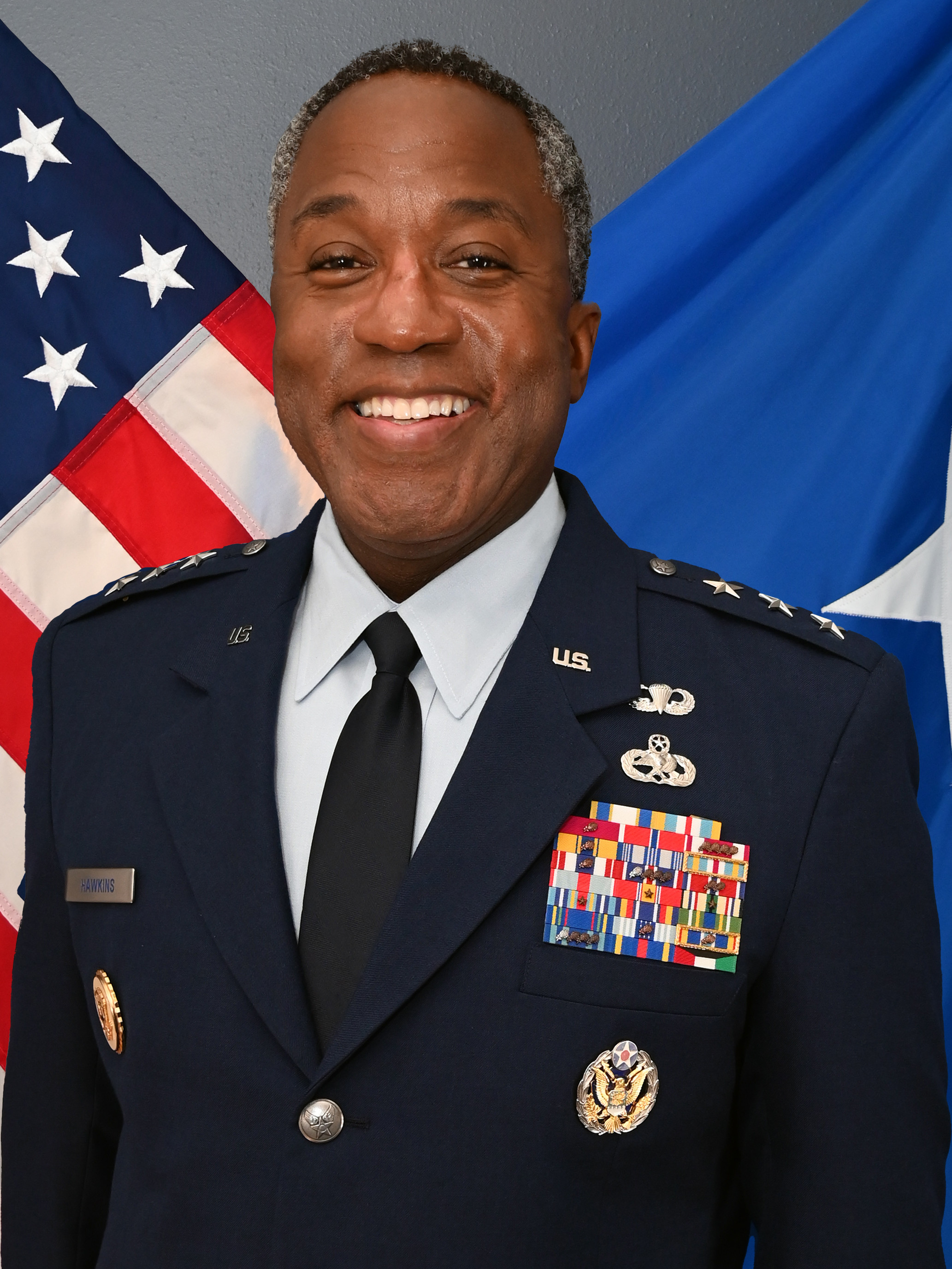
- Official portrait, 2025
- Born: Bastrop, Louisiana, U.S.
- Military career
- Allegiance: United States
- Branch: United States Air Force
- Service years: 1991–2025
- Rank: Lieutenant General
- Commands: Ogden Air Logistics Complex; 10th Air Base Wing; 305th Aircraft Maintenance Squadron
- Awards: Defense Superior Service Medal; Legion of Merit (2); Bronze Star

Stacey Tremayne Hawkins is a retired United States Air Force lieutenant general who served as the commander of the Air Force Sustainment Center. He previously served as director of logistics, engineering, and force protection of the Air Combat Command.

== Military career ==
In May 2022, Hawkins was nominated for promotion to lieutenant general and assignment as commander of the Air Force Sustainment Center.

Military offices
Preceded by Tim Gibson	Commander of the 10th Air Base Wing; 2013–2015	Succeeded by Troy E. Dunn
Preceded by Warren D. Berry	Director of Logistics, Civil Engineering, Force Protection, and Nuclear Integration of the Air Mobility Command; 2015–2017	Succeeded by Steven Bleymaier
Preceded by Steven Bleymaier	Commander of the Ogden Air Logistics Complex; 2017–2019	Succeeded by C. McCauley von Hoffman
Preceded by Allan Day	Director of Logistics, Civil Engineering, Force Protection, and Nuclear Integration of the Air Force Materiel Command; 2019–2021	Succeeded by C. McCauley von Hoffman
Preceded by Tom D. Miller	Director of Logistics, Engineering, and Force Protection of the Air Combat Command; 2021–2022	Succeeded by Jennifer Hammerstedt
Preceded by Tom D. Miller	Commander of the Air Force Sustainment Center; 2022–2025	Succeeded by Jennifer Hammerstedt
