= Boise State Broncos =

Intercollegiate sports teams of Boise State University

- University: Boise State University
- Nickname: Broncos
- NCAA: Division I (FBS)
- Conference: Pac-12 (primary); Big 12 (beach volleyball)
- Athletic director: Jeramiah Dickey
- Location: Boise, Idaho
- Varsity teams: 18 (7 men's and 11 women's)
- Football stadium: Albertsons Stadium
- Basketball arena: ExtraMile Arena
- Other venues: Appleton Tennis Center; Boas Tennis/Soccer Complex; Bronco Gym; Donna Larsen Park
- Colors: Blue and orange
- Mascot: Buster Bronco
- Website: broncosports.com

The Boise State Broncos are the intercollegiate athletic teams that represent Boise State University, located in Boise, Idaho. The Broncos compete at the National Collegiate Athletic Association (NCAA) Division I level as a member of the Pac-12 Conference (Pac-12). The Broncos have a successful athletic program overall, winning the WAC commissioner's cup for the 2005–06 and 2009–10 years. Boise State left the Mountain West and joined the Pac-12 on July 1, 2026.

Boise State's best-known program is football, which attained a perfect 13–0 record in 2006, capped by an overtime win in the Fiesta Bowl over the Oklahoma Sooners. They finished the season as the only major undefeated college football team. BSU's football team has won the Fiesta Bowl two more times, following the 2009 and 2014 seasons. The school's Albertsons Stadium introduced its famous blue artificial turf (now FieldTurf) forty years ago in 1986.

Other notable programs at BSU include the nationally ranked women's gymnastics team, the men's and women's basketball team, and the tennis teams which have consistently had nationally ranked players.

== Conference affiliations ==
- Pac-12 – joined 2026 (current)
- Mountain West (MW) – joined 2011
- Western Athletic (WAC) – joined 2001
- Big West – joined 1996
- Big Sky – joined 1970

== Sports sponsored ==
Boise State University sponsors teams in seven men's and eleven women's NCAA sanctioned sports, primarily competing in the Pac-12 Conference, with the beach volleyball program competing in the Big 12 Conference.

Men's sports	Women's sports
Basketball	Basketball
Cross country	Beach volleyball
Football	Cross country
Golf	Golf
Tennis	Gymnastics
Track and field^{†}	Soccer
	Softball
	Tennis
	Track and field^{†}
	Volleyball
† – Track and field includes both indoor and outdoor

=== Football ===
Boise State was a member of the Mountain West Conference

The football competes in the Football Bowl Subdivision (FBS) of Division I as a member of the Pac-12 Conference. The head coach is currently Spencer Danielson, and the team plays their home games at Albertsons Stadium.

=== Basketball ===
The basketball program competes in the NCAA Division 1 as a member of the Pac-12 Conference. They are led by coach Leon Rice, and play their home games at ExtraMile Arena.

=== Soccer ===
The 2009 women's soccer team participated in the first round of the NCAA Women's Soccer Championship tournament. Boise State was eliminated in the first round, losing to host UCLA 7–1 on Friday, November 13.

== Former varsity sports ==
=== Baseball ===
Boise State played intercollegiate baseball through the 1980 season. Their first season in the Big Sky Conference was 1971, with all eight teams split into two divisions and a best-of-three series between the division winners to determine the conference title. The Broncos and fellow newcomer Northern Arizona joined Idaho State and Weber State in the Southern Division. Montana State dropped the sport after the season and Montana in 1972, so Boise State was moved to the Northern Division for 1973 with Idaho and Gonzaga.

After the season, athletic director Lyle Smith stepped down as head baseball coach, succeeded by Ross Vaughn, an assistant coach at Washington State in Pullman pursuing a doctorate in biomechanics.

Following the 1974 season, the Big Sky discontinued its sponsorship of baseball (and four other sports); Southern Division champion Idaho State dropped their program a few weeks later, and three-time conference champion Weber State soon followed. The three Northern Division teams joined the newly formed Northern Pacific Conference (NorPac) for the 1975 season and competed against Portland State, Portland, Seattle U., and Puget Sound (and later, Eastern Washington). Due to budget constraints, both BSU and Idaho discontinued baseball following the 1980 season. Head coach Vaughn stayed with the university another three decades as a kinesiology professor and an associate dean.

Boise State played on campus through the 1979 season, until displaced due to construction of the BSU Pavilion (now ExtraMile Arena). The final infield is now occupied by the tennis courts; home plate was at (43.60317°N 116.20043°W), center field was to the northeast, and the first base line was aligned with the sidewalk along the southern wall of ExtraMile Arena. For their last season in 1980, the Broncos played home games at Borah Field (now Bill Wigle Field) at Borah High School.

With the elimination of wrestling in 2017, the baseball program returned in 2019 for the 2020 season; a coaching search began in September 2017, and Gary Van Tol was hired as head coach in November. However, that season was canceled, along with all remaining NCAA competitions for the school year, just 14 games in when the COVID-19 pandemic was declared, leading to baseball's second elimination later that summer when the athletic department's budget was reduced by $3 million. The Broncos recorded a 9–5 record in their brief return. Most of the remaining players moved to other Bronco programs or transferred to Pac-12 Conference schools.

=== Wrestling ===
In 1999, as an assistant coach for the Broncos, Greg Randall helped guide Kirk White to the 165-pound national title. In his 14 seasons as head coach, Gregg Randall's teams have finished in the top-three at the conference tournament 10 times. In 1988, BSU wrestling joined the Pac-10 Conference. Randall has led the Broncos to the top of the Pac-12 Conference four times, to go along with seven top-25 finishes at the NCAA Championships including a 9th-place finish at the 2010–11 NCAA Championships. In 2006 Randall guided his first individual NCAA Champion as a head coach with Ben Cherrington capturing the national title in the 157-pound weight class. Cherrington was the second wrestler Randall has helped to a first-place finish at the NCAA tournament. Cherrington completed his season undefeated at 20–0 and won the 157-pound title at the NCAA National Championships. Cherrington's NCAA victory marked the second time in Boise State history a Bronco has own an individual national collegiate wrestling title. Boise State Wrestling competes at home in the Bronco's Gym or the ExtraMile Arena, both located on campus. After the 2016 season, Randall was replaced by former CSU Bakersfield wrestler and coach Mike Mendoza after a 9-26-1 record over the previous three seasons.

In April 2017, after a 2–9 season and an 11-35-1 record over four years, Boise State announced they would eliminate their wrestling program. The school also cited a desire to closer align itself with the Mountain West (which does not sponsor wrestling), a $350,000 loss during the 2016–17 season, and a plan to resurrect the school's baseball program.

==== Wrestling achievements ====
- 16 total conference Championships
- Pac-12 Conference Champions: 2000, 2002, 2004, 2008, 2009, 2011
- 20 individual All-Americans
- 12 top-20 NCAA team finishes & 5 top-10 NCAA team finishes
- 2 individual NCAA Champions: Ben Cherrington 157lbs(2006) & Kirk White 165lbs(1999)

== National Championships ==
=== NCAA team championships ===
Boise State has won one NCAA team national championship.

- Men's (1)
  - Football : 1980 (Division I-AA)

=== NJCAA team championships ===
Boise Junior College won one NJCAA team national championship.

- Men's (1)
  - Football : 1958 (NJCAA)

=== Individual national championships ===
- Men's Skiing (Slalom): Bill Shaw, 1974
- Men's Track & Field (High Jump): Jake Jacoby, 1984
- Men's Track & Field (Triple Jump): Eugene Green, 1991
- Wrestling (165 lbs.): Kirk White, 1999
- Men's Track & Field (Javelin): Gabe Wallin, 2004
- Men's Track & Field (Javelin): Gabe Wallin, 2005
- Wrestling (157 lbs.): Ben Cherrington, 2006
- Women's Track & Field (Long Jump): Eleni Kafourou, 2009
- Men's Track & Field (Decathlon): Kurt Felix, 2012
- Women's Track & Field (10,000 meters) : Emma Bates, 2014
- Women's Track & Field (Steeplechase) : Allie Ostrander, 2017
- Women's Track & Field (Steeplechase) : Allie Ostrander, 2018

== Athletic staff ==
=== Athletic directors ===
Name	Years served
Jeramiah Dickey	2021–present
Curt Apsey	2015–2021
Mark Coyle	2012–2015
Curt Apsey (interim)	2011
Gene Bleymaier	1982–2011
Mike Mullally	1981–1982
Lyle Smith	1968–1981

=== Current head coaches ===
Name	Sport	Year #
Spencer Danielson	Football	1st
Leon Rice	Men's Basketball	14th
Gordy Presnell	Women's Basketball	18th
Jim Thomas	Women's Soccer	10th
Shawn Garus	Women's Volleyball	14th
Kristian Widen	Men's Tennis	3rd
Tina Bird	Gymnastics	14th*
Justin Shults	Softball	2nd
Doc Haskell	Esports	

* Co-head coach from 2010 - 2020

== Hall of Fame ==
College Football Hall of Fame

- Randy Trautman – DT, 1978–1981
