= Pac-12 Conference =

American collegiate athletics conference

- Formerly: Athletic Association of Western Universities (AAWU, 1959–1968); Pacific-8 (1968–1978); Pacific-10 (1978–2011)
- Association: NCAA
- Founded: 1915; 111 years ago (as the Pacific Coast Conference); 1959; 67 years ago (as the AAWU)
- Commissioner: Teresa Gould (since March 1, 2024)
- Sports fielded: 19; men's: 9; women's: 10
- Division: Division I
- Subdivision: FBS
- No. of teams: 9
- Headquarters: San Ramon, California, U.S.
- Region: Western United States, Southern United States
- Broadcasters: CBS Sports; CW Sports; USA Sports
- Streaming partners: Paramount+ ESPN
- Website: pac-12.com

Locations
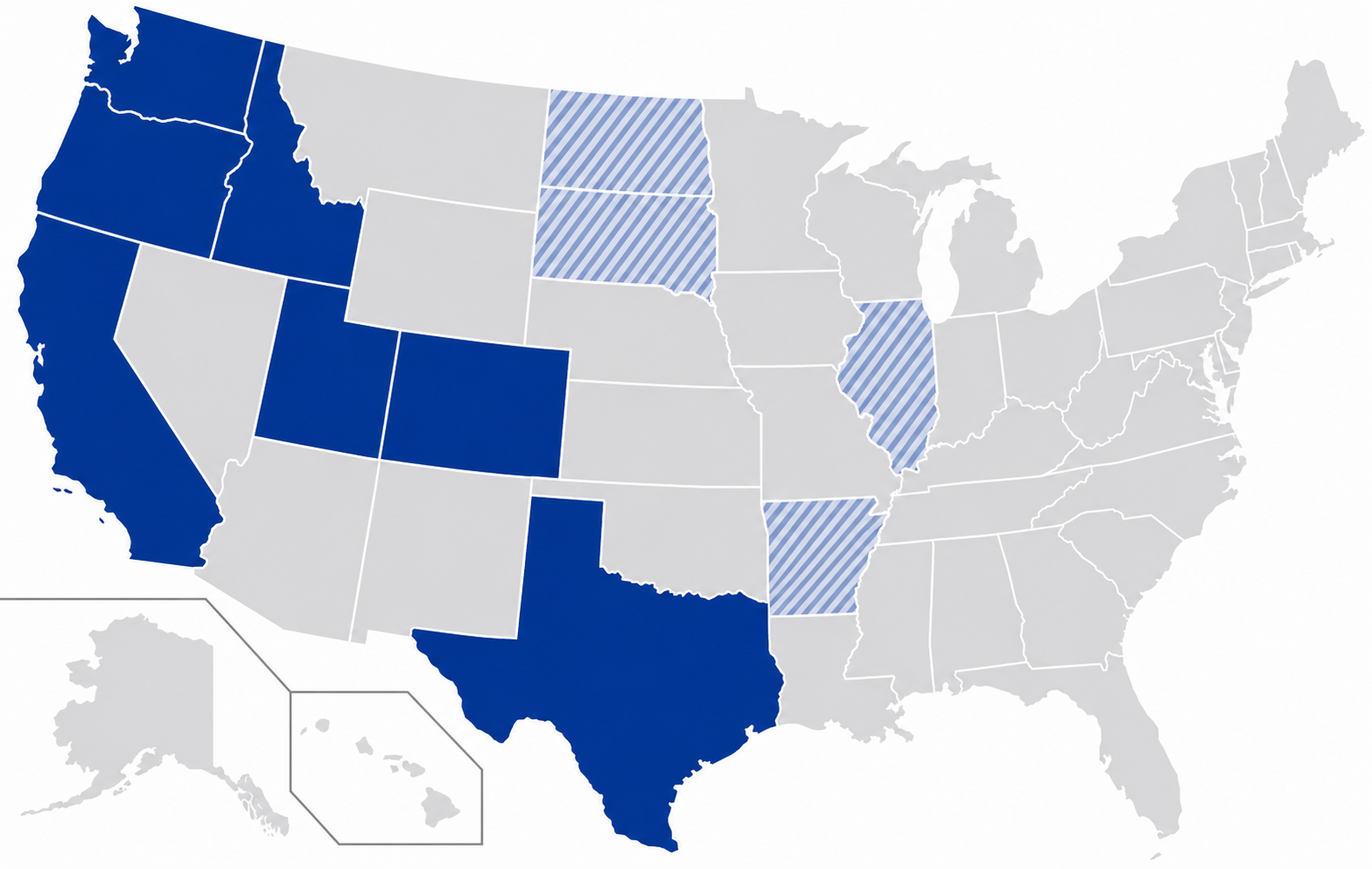

The Pac-12 Conference is a collegiate athletic conference in the Western United States and Southern United States. It participates at the National Collegiate Athletic Association (NCAA) Division I level for all sports, and its football teams compete in the Football Bowl Subdivision (FBS), the highest level of NCAA football competition. The conference currently consists of nine full-member institutions located in the states of California, Colorado, Idaho, Oregon, Texas, Utah, and Washington.

The modern Pac-12 Conference formed after the disbanding of the Pacific Coast Conference (PCC), the principal members of which founded the Athletic Association of Western Universities (AAWU) in 1959. The conference previously went by the names Big Five, Big Six, Pacific-8, and Pacific-10. The Pac-12 moniker was adopted in 2011 with the addition of Colorado and Utah.

Nicknamed the "Conference of Champions" (a phrase coined by former Washington State basketball coach George Raveling), the Pac-12 has won more NCAA national championships in team sports than any other conference in history. Washington's national title in women's rowing in 2017 was the 500th NCAA championship won by a Pac-12 school. The Pac-12 holds a 200-plus championship lead over the second-place conference.

Following the departure of ten members during the 2021–2026 NCAA conference realignment, the conference temporarily operated with Oregon State and Washington State as its only full members during the 2024–25 and 2025–26 academic years. Beginning with the 2026–27 year, the Pac-12 expanded to nine full members and nineteen sports with the additions of Boise State, Fresno State, Colorado State, Gonzaga, San Diego State, Texas State, and Utah State. The conference also expanded its affiliate membership in baseball, men's soccer, men's wrestling, and women's gymnastics.

== Member universities ==
=== Full members ===
Pac-12 Conference full members
— Full member
— Full Member (Non-Football)

The Pac-12 currently has nine full member institutions. The conference was previously split into two divisions, the North Division and the South Division, for football only. On September 12, 2024, the conference announced it would be adding four new members, Boise State, Colorado State, Fresno State, and San Diego State, on July 1, 2026. However, the conference needed to add at least two more football-playing members to be recognized by the NCAA as an FBS conference. On September 23, 2024, Utah State accepted an offer to join the league as its seventh member. This gave the Pac-12 the seven members needed to preserve its official "multisport" status, though one more football-sponsoring full member was needed to preserve FBS status. On September 30, 2024, the conference announced that Gonzaga, a non-football University, would be joining as a full member. In June 2025, it was reported that Texas State would announce its move to the Pac-12 on June 30, 2025, the last day before that school's exit fee from the Sun Belt Conference would have doubled from $5 million to $10 million. Texas State's arrival, announced that same day, marked the ninth full-time member for the Pac-12 and also the eighth and final football member required to preserve FBS status.

Institution	Location	Founded	Type	Enrollment (fall 2023)	Median earnings	Endowment (millions – FY24)	Nickname	Joined (Note: Represents the calendar year when fall sports competition begins.)	Colors
Boise State University	Boise, Idaho	1932	Public	26,670	$64,791	$162	Broncos	2026	
California State University, Fresno	Fresno, California	1911	Public	23,986	$59,992	$255	Bulldogs	2026	
Colorado State University	Fort Collins, Colorado	1870	Public	33,500	$67,911	$624	Rams	2026	
Gonzaga University (Note: Non-football member.)	Spokane, Washington	1887	Catholic (Jesuit)	7,306	$80,896	$452	Bulldogs	2026	
Oregon State University	Corvallis, Oregon	1868	Public	35,622	$71,799	$1,010	Beavers	1915, 1964	
San Diego State University	San Diego, California	1897	Public	39,241	$68,268	$460	Aztecs	2026	
Texas State University	San Marcos, Texas	1899	Public	40,678	$58,786	$393	Bobcats	2026	
Utah State University	Logan, Utah	1888	Public	28,063	$63,484	$615	Aggies	2026	
Washington State University	Pullman, Washington	1890	Public	26,490	$73,467	$1,500	Cougars	1917, 1962	

=== Affiliate members ===
The Pac-12 has affiliate member institutions competing in baseball, men's soccer, men's wrestling, women's swimming & diving, and women's gymnastics.

Institution	Location	Founded	Type	Enrollment (fall 2023)	Nickname	Joined (Note: Represents the calendar year when fall sports competition begins.)	Colors	Pac-12 sport(s)	Primary conference
United States Air Force Academy (Air Force)	Air Force Academy, Colorado (Note: Virtually all of the Air Force Academy grounds, including the cadet area and all athletic facilities, are outside the city limits of Colorado Springs. The US Postal Service considers the Academy to be its own entity, and the US Census Bureau considers it to be the census-designated place of Air Force Academy, Colorado.)	1954	Military	4,124	Falcons	2026 (Note: Effective July 1.)		Men's wrestling	Mountain West (MW)
California Baptist University (Cal Baptist)	Riverside, California	1950	Baptist	11,491	Lancers	2026		Men's soccer	Big West (BWC)
California Baptist University (Cal Baptist)	Riverside, California	1950	Baptist	11,491	Lancers	2026		Women's swimming and diving	Big West (BWC)
California Polytechnic State University (Cal Poly or Cal Poly San Luis Obispo)	San Luis Obispo, California	1901	Public	22,485	Mustangs	1986		Men's wrestling	Big West (BWC)
California Polytechnic State University (Cal Poly or Cal Poly San Luis Obispo)	San Luis Obispo, California	1901	Public	22,485	Mustangs	2026		Men's soccer	Big West (BWC)
California State University, Bakersfield (Note: Cal State–Bakersfield initially announced it would become a men's soccer affiliate starting in 2013, but never went through with those plans, accepting an invitation to become an all-sports member of the Western Athletic Conference, which sponsors men's soccer, also in 2013; it would move to the Big West Conference, which also sponsors men's soccer, in 2020. The school maintains its Pac-12 affiliation in wrestling, which neither the WAC nor the Big West sponsors.) (Cal State Bakersfield)	Bakersfield, California	1965	Public	9,787	Roadrunners	1987		Men's wrestling	Big West (BWC)
Dallas Baptist University (DBU)	Dallas, Texas	1898	Baptist	4,201	Patriots	2026		Baseball	Lone Star (LSC) (Note: Currently an NCAA Division II athletic conference.)
University of Northern Colorado (UNC)	Greeley, Colorado	1889	Public	9,067	Bears	2026		Men's wrestling	Big Sky (BSC)
Northern Illinois University (NIU)	DeKalb, Illinois	1895	Public	15,504	Huskies	2026		Men's wrestling	Horizon
North Dakota State University	Fargo, North Dakota	1890	Public	11,952	Bison	2026		Men's wrestling	Summit
Southern Utah University	Cedar City, Utah	1897	Public	15,033	Thunderbirds (Note: Southern Utah uses the nicknames "Flippin' Birds" and "Thunderbirds" interchangeably for its women's gymnastics program.)	2026		Women's gymnastics	Big Sky (BSC)
South Dakota State University	Brookings, South Dakota	1881	Public	12,139	Jackrabbits	2026		Men's wrestling	Summit
University of Arkansas at Little Rock (Little Rock (Note: Formerly branded athletically as Arkansas–Little Rock (or UALR).))	Little Rock, Arkansas	1927	Public	8,158	Trojans	2019 (Note: Despite initially joining in the 2019–20 school year, they began competition in the 2020–21 school year during the COVID pandemic.)		Men's wrestling	United (UAC)
University of California, Riverside (UC Riverside)	Riverside, California	1954	Public	26,809	Highlanders	2026		Men's soccer	Big West (BWC)
University of California, San Diego (UC San Diego)	La Jolla, California (Note: La Jolla is a San Diego neighborhood with its own postal identity.)	1960	Public	42,968	Tritons	2026		Men's soccer	Big West (BWC) (West Coast (WCC) in 2027)

Notes

Pac-12 Conference affiliate members
– Affiliate members

=== Former full members ===
No school had left the Pac-12 from its founding as the AAWU in 1959 until 2024, when 10 of its 12 schools left. Two members of the PCC, Idaho and Montana, were not invited to join the AAWU or its successors.

Institution	Location	Founded	Type	Nickname	Joined (Note: Represents the calendar year when fall sports competition begins.)	Left (Note: Represents the calendar year when spring sports competition ends.)	Colors	Current conference
University of Montana	Missoula, Montana	1893	Public	Grizzlies	1924	1950		Big Sky (BSC)
University of Idaho	Moscow, Idaho	1889	Public	Vandals	1922	1959		Big Sky (BSC)
University of Oregon	Eugene, Oregon	1876	Public	Ducks	1915	1959		Big Ten (B1G)
University of Oregon	Eugene, Oregon	1876	Public	Ducks	1964	2024		Big Ten (B1G)
University of Washington	Seattle, Washington	1861	Public	Huskies	1915	2024		Big Ten (B1G)
University of Southern California	Los Angeles, California	1880	Nonsectarian (Note: USC was historically affiliated with the Methodist Church until 1952.)	Trojans	1922	2024		Big Ten (B1G)
University of California, Los Angeles	Los Angeles, California	1881	Public	Bruins	1928	2024		Big Ten (B1G)
University of Arizona	Tucson, Arizona	1885	Public	Wildcats	1978	2024		Big 12
Arizona State University	Tempe, Arizona (Note: Tempe hosts the main campus and university administration. ASU has three other physical campuses in the Phoenix Area.)	1885	Public	Sun Devils	1978	2024		Big 12
University of Colorado Boulder	Boulder, Colorado	1876	Public	Buffaloes	2011	2024		Big 12
University of Utah	Salt Lake City, Utah	1850	Public	Utes	2011	2024		Big 12
University of California, Berkeley	Berkeley, California	1868	Public	Golden Bears	1915	2024		Atlantic Coast (ACC)
Stanford University	Stanford, California	1891	Nonsectarian	Cardinal	1918	2024		Atlantic Coast (ACC)

=== Former affiliate members ===
Institution	Location	Founded	Type	Nickname	Joined (Note: Represents the calendar year when fall sports competition begins.)	Left (Note: Represents the calendar year when spring sports competition ends.)	Colors	Pac-12 sport(s)	Primary conference	Current conference in former Pac-12 sport(s)
University of Arizona	Tucson, Arizona	1885	Public	Wildcats	1965	1978		Men's wrestling	Big 12	N/A (Note: Arizona dropped men's wrestling after the 1979–80 school year; with the latter two seasons being a full member of the Pac-8/10.)
Arizona State University	Tempe, Arizona (Note: Tempe hosts the main campus and university administration. ASU has three other physical campuses in the Phoenix Area.)	1885	Public	Sun Devils	1963	1978		Men's wrestling	Big 12	
Boise State University	Boise, Idaho	1932	Public	Broncos	1986	2017		Men's wrestling	Pac-12	N/A (Note: Boise State dropped men's wrestling after the 2016–17 school year.)
University of California, Davis (UC Davis)	Davis, California	1905	Public	Aggies	1992	2010		Men's wrestling	Mountain West (MW)	N/A (Note: UC Davis dropped men's wrestling after the 2009–10 school year.)
University of California, Davis (UC Davis)	Davis, California	1905	Public	Aggies	2023	2024		Women's lacrosse	Mountain West (MW)	Big 12
University of California, Santa Barbara (UC Santa Barbara)	Santa Barbara, California	1909	Public	Gauchos	2010	2014		Men's swimming & diving	Big West (BWC) (West Coast Conference in 2027)	
University of California, Santa Barbara (UC Santa Barbara)	Santa Barbara, California	1909	Public	Gauchos	1963	1966		Baseball	Big West (BWC) (West Coast Conference in 2027)	
University of California, Santa Barbara (UC Santa Barbara)	Santa Barbara, California	1909	Public	Gauchos	1975	1976		Baseball	Big West (BWC) (West Coast Conference in 2027)	
California Polytechnic State University (Cal Poly) (Note: Cal Poly has been a Pac-12 affiliate in men's wrestling since 1986, and added men's soccer to its Pac-12 membership in 2026.)	San Luis Obispo, California	1901	Public	Mustangs	2010	2014		Men's swimming & diving	Big West (BWC)	
California State University, Fresno (Fresno State)	Fresno, California	1911	Public	Bulldogs	1986	1991		Men's wrestling	Pac-12	N/A (Note: Fresno State eventually dropped men's wrestling after the 2005–06 school year. The program was revived in 2017 and competed in the Big 12 Conference until being discontinued again after the 2020–21 school year.)
California State University, Fresno (Fresno State)	Fresno, California	1911	Public	Bulldogs	2002	2004		Men's soccer	Pac-12	N/A (Note: Fresno State eventually dropped men's soccer after the 2003 fall season (2003–04 school year).)
California State University, Fullerton (Cal State Fullerton)	Fullerton, California	1957	Public	Titans	1986	2011		Men's wrestling	Big West (BWC)	N/A (Note: Cal State Fullerton dropped men's wrestling after the 2010–11 school year.)
University of Colorado Boulder (Colorado)	Boulder, Colorado	1876	Public	Buffaloes	1951	1980		Men's wrestling	Big 12	N/A (Note: Colorado dropped men's wrestling after the 1979–80 school year.)
Eastern Washington University	Cheney, Washington	1882	Public	Eagles	1981	1990		Baseball	Big Sky (BSC)	N/A (Note: Eastern Washington dropped baseball after the 1990 spring season (1989–90 school year).)
University of Idaho	Moscow, Idaho	1889	Public	Vandals	1959	1964		Baseball	Big Sky (BSC)	N/A (Note: Idaho dropped baseball after the 1980 spring season (1979–80 school year).)
Occidental College	Los Angeles, California	1887	Secular (Note: Historically affiliated with the Presbyterian Church in the United States of America (not to be confused with the current Presbyterian Church (USA)).)	Tigers	1942	1943		Baseball	Southern Cal (SCIAC) (Note: Currently an NCAA Division III athletic conference.)	
Pepperdine University	Malibu, California (Note: The Pepperdine campus has a Malibu mailing address but lies entirely within unincorporated Los Angeles County.)	1937	Churches of Christ	Waves	1942	1943		Baseball	West Coast (WCC)	
Portland State University	Portland, Oregon	1946	Public	Vikings	1981	1998		Baseball	Big Sky (BSC)	N/A (Note: Portland State dropped baseball after the 1998 spring season (1997–98 school year).)
Portland State University	Portland, Oregon	1946	Public	Vikings	1998	2009		Men's wrestling	Big Sky (BSC)	N/A (Note: Portland State dropped men's wrestling after the 2008–09 school year.)
University of Portland	Portland, Oregon	1901	Catholic (CSC)	Pilots	1981	1995		Baseball	West Coast (WCC)	
Saint Mary's College of California	Moraga, California	1863	Catholic (FSC)	Gaels	1926	1943		Baseball	West Coast (WCC)	
Saint Mary's College of California	Moraga, California	1863	Catholic (FSC)	Gaels	1946	1950		Baseball	West Coast (WCC)	
San Diego State University	San Diego, California	1897	Public	Aztecs	2023	2024		Women's lacrosse	Pac-12	Big 12
University of San Francisco	San Francisco, California	1855	Catholic (Jesuit)	Dons	1930	1932		Baseball	West Coast (WCC)	
University of San Francisco	San Francisco, California	1855	Catholic (Jesuit)	Dons	1942	1943		Baseball	West Coast (WCC)	
San Jose State University	San Jose, California	1857	Public	Spartans	1986	1988		Men's wrestling	Mountain West (MW)	N/A (Note: San Jose State dropped men's wrestling after the 1987–88 school year.)
Santa Clara University	Santa Clara, California	1851	Catholic (Jesuit)	Broncos	1926	1943		Baseball	West Coast (WCC)	
Santa Clara University	Santa Clara, California	1851	Catholic (Jesuit)	Broncos	1946	1966		Baseball	West Coast (WCC)	
University of Utah	Salt Lake City, Utah	1850	Public	Utes	1958	1976		Men's wrestling	Big 12	N/A (Note: Utah dropped men's wrestling after the 1975–76 school year.)
Utah State University	Logan, Utah	1888	Public	Aggies	1986	1989		Men's wrestling	Pac-12	N/A (Note: Utah State dropped men's wrestling after the 1988–89 school year.)
Whittier College	Whittier, California	1887	Secular (Note: Historically affiliated with the Quakers.)	Poets	1942	1943		Baseball	Southern Cal (SCIAC)	

=== Membership timeline ===
The Pac-12 claims the PCC's history as its own. Not only did it maintain the automatic bid from the Rose Bowl inherited from the PCC, but the eight largest schools in the old PCC all eventually joined the new league. However, the old PCC operated under a separate charter.

The Pac-12 is one of the founding members of the Mountain Pacific Sports Federation (MPSF), a conference organized to provide competition in non-revenue Olympic sports. All-Pac-12 members participate in at least one MPSF sport (men's and women's indoor track and field both actually have enough participating Pac-12 schools for the conference to sponsor a championship, but the Pac-12 has opted not to do so). For certain sports, the Pac-12 admits certain schools as associate members.

Full members Full members (non-football) Associate members (football only) Assoc. member (list sports) Independent Other conference 1 Other conference 2

== History ==
=== Pacific Coast Conference ===
The roots of the Pac-12 Conference go back to December 2, 1915, when the Pacific Coast Conference (PCC) was founded at the Imperial Hotel in Portland, Oregon, during the annual meeting of the Northwest Conference schools. Charter members were the University of California (now University of California, Berkeley), University of Washington, University of Oregon, and Oregon Agricultural College (now Oregon State University). An official of Stanford University also attended the meeting but declined to join right away because, unlike the other schools, it was not going to sponsor a football team in the coming year and it was not willing to prohibit freshmen from competing in sports. The PCC began play in 1916.

One year later, Washington State College (now Washington State University) joined the league, followed by Stanford University in 1918.

In 1922, the PCC expanded to eight teams with the admission of USC and Idaho. Montana joined the Conference in 1924, and in 1928, the PCC grew to 10 members with the addition of UCLA.

For many years, the conference split into two divisions for basketball and baseball—a Southern Division comprising the four California schools and a Northern Division comprising the six schools in the Pacific Northwest.

In 1950, Montana departed to join the Mountain States Conference. The PCC continued as a nine-team league through June 1959.

=== AAWU (Big Five and Big Six) ===
Following "pay-for-play" scandals at California, USC, UCLA, and Washington, the PCC disbanded in June 1959. Ten months earlier in August 1958, these four schools agreed to form a new conference that would take effect the following summer. When the four schools and Stanford began discussions for a new conference in 1959, retired admiral Thomas J. Hamilton interceded and suggested the schools consider creating a national "power conference" (Hamilton had been a key player, head coach, and athletic director at Navy, and was the current athletic director at Pittsburgh). Nicknamed the "Airplane Conference", the five former PCC schools would have played with other major academically oriented schools, including Army, Navy, Air Force, Notre Dame, Pitt, Penn State, and Syracuse. The effort fell through when a Pentagon official vetoed the idea and the service academies backed out.

On July 1, 1959, the new Athletic Association of Western Universities was launched, with California, UCLA, USC, and Washington as the four charter members. Stanford joined during the first month. Hamilton left Pittsburgh to become the first commissioner of the AAWU, and remained for twelve years. The conference also was popularly known as the Big Five from 1960 to 1962. When Washington State joined in 1962, the conference became informally known as the Big Six. The new league inherited the PCC's berth in the Rose Bowl; since 1947, the PCC champion had received an automatic bid to the bowl.

Idaho was never invited to join the AAWU; the Vandals were independent for four years until the formation of the Big Sky Conference in 1963, and were independent in football until 1965.

=== Pacific-8 ===
Oregon and Oregon State joined in the summer of 1964. With their addition, the conference was known unofficially as the Pacific Athletic Conference, and then the Pacific-8. In 1968, the AAWU formally renamed itself the Pacific-8 Conference, or Pac-8 for short. The Pac-8 did not allow a second bowl team from the conference until the 1975 season; in basketball, participation in the National Invitation Tournament (NIT) was not allowed until 1973.

=== Pacific-10 ===
Final Pac-10 Conference logo

In 1978, the conference added Arizona and Arizona State from the Western Athletic Conference, becoming the Pacific-10 Conference or Pac-10. The invitations to the schools were extended in December 1976, and the expansion formally announced in May 1977.

In the mid-1980s, three of the northwest schools (Oregon, Oregon State, Washington State) were having financial difficulties in athletics, primarily with revenue from football, and their long-term membership in the conference was in question.

The Pac-10 began sponsoring women's athletics in the fall of 1986. Women's teams previously competed with other large universities on the Pacific coast in either the Northern Pacific Conference or the Western Collegiate Athletic Association.

In the mid-1990s, the conference expressed interest in admitting the University of Colorado and the University of Texas after the collapse of the Southwest Conference. Texas expressed an interest in joining a strong academic conference, but joined three fellow Southwest Conference schools (Texas A&M, Texas Tech, and Baylor) to merge with the Big Eight Conference to form the Big 12 Conference in 1996. Colorado elected to remain in the newly formed Big 12.

Logo used from 2011 to 2026.

Before the addition of Colorado and Utah in 2011, only the Ivy League had maintained its membership for a longer time than the Pac-10 among Division I conferences. Commissioner Larry Scott said on February 9, 2010, that the window for expansion was open for the next year as the conference began negotiations for a new television deal. Speaking on a conference call to introduce former Big 12 commissioner Kevin Weiberg as his new deputy, Scott talked about possibly adding new teams to the conference and launching a new television network. Scott, the former head of the Women's Tennis Association, took over the conference in July 2009. In his first eight months on the job, he saw growing interest from the membership over the possibility of adding teams for the first time since Arizona and Arizona State joined the conference in 1978.

=== "Legacy" Pac-12 ===
In early June 2010, there were reports that the Pac-10 was considering adding up to six teams to the conference: the University of Texas, Texas A&M University, Texas Tech University, the University of Oklahoma, Oklahoma State University, and the University of Colorado.

On June 10, 2010, the University of Colorado Boulder accepted an invitation to join the Pac-10 Conference, effective starting with the 2012–2013 academic year. The school later announced it would join the conference a year earlier than previously announced, in the 2011–2012 academic year.

On June 15, 2010, a deal was reached between Texas and the Big 12 Conference to keep Texas, Texas A&M, Texas Tech, Oklahoma, and Oklahoma State in the Big 12. Following Texas' decision, the other Big 12 schools that had been rumored candidates to join the Pac-10 announced they would remain in the Big 12. This deal effectively ended the Pac-10's ambition to potentially become a sixteen-team conference.

On June 17, 2010, the University of Utah accepted an invitation to join the Pac-10 Conference, effective starting July 2011. Utah was a member of the Western Athletic Conference (WAC) with Arizona and Arizona State before those two left for the Pac-10 in 1978. The Utes left an expanded WAC with seven other schools in 1999 to form the new Mountain West Conference. Utah became the first "BCS Buster" to join a BCS conference, having played in (and won) two BCS games beforehand.

On July 27, 2010, the conference unveiled a new logo and announced that the Pac-10 would be renamed the Pac-12 when Utah and Colorado formally joined in July 2011. On October 21, the Pac-12 announced that its football competition would be split into two divisions—a North Division comprising the Pacific Northwest and Bay Area schools, and a South Division comprising the Mountain Time Zone and Southern California schools. On July 1, 2011, the Pac-12 assumed its 12-team alignment when both Colorado and Utah officially joined as full members.

On August 15, 2012, the conference debuted the Pac-12 Network. It was the third college sports conference to launch a dedicated network, and the first to completely fund and own their own network outright.

The conference had been based in Walnut Creek since the late 1970s until August 2014. Since 2014, the conference was headquartered in San Francisco, California, with the conference moving to working remotely once the lease expires in June 2023. The Pac-12 Network and meeting space for headquarters employees are now located at Bishop Ranch in San Ramon, an East Bay suburb.

=== NCAA conference realignment (2021–2023) ===
On August 24, 2021, the Pac-12, ACC, and Big Ten announced the formation of a "historic alliance" that would bring their member institutions "together on a collaborative approach surrounding the future evolution of college athletics and scheduling." The formation of this alliance between three of the Power Five conferences was in response to Oklahoma and Texas announcing plans to leave the Big 12 and join the SEC. The alliance included an inter-conference scheduling component for football and men's and women's basketball. In 2021, the Pac-12 paid $19.8 million to each of its member schools, the lowest distribution in the Power Five.

Despite the alliance, on June 30, 2022, UCLA and USC announced their departure for the Big Ten Conference beginning in the 2024–25 academic year. As a result of losing two of the conference's tentpole programs (and the entirety of the Los Angeles television market), the conference's ongoing media rights negotiations became much more complicated. ESPN reportedly had made an offer in which the ten remaining schools would receive around $30 million per year. This was rejected by member schools, who countered with a demand for $50 million per school per year. ESPN responded by walking away from the negotiating table.

Reports began circulating that Pac-12 Commissioner George Kliavkoff had been to the San Diego State University and SMU campuses for tours. This was allegedly part of the conference's vetting process for expansion. San Diego State sent the Mountain West Conference a letter notifying it of the school's impending departure. The Pac-12, however, was adamant about securing a media rights deal before expanding. Without an incoming offer before a June 30, 2023, deadline, San Diego State had to rescind its notice of intention to leave the Mountain West.

At the start of Pac-12 Media Days on July 21, 2023, Commissioner Kliavkoff was asked about the status of the media rights deal and conference expansion, deflecting most questions on the matter. Colorado president Rick George left Media Days early to return to Boulder. Less than a week later on July 27, 2023, Colorado announced it would return to the Big 12 as of the 2024–25 school year.

The nine remaining Pac-12 members then demanded an update on the negotiations, including numbers on expected payouts. Kliavkoff came back with a deal from the Apple TV+ streaming service that paid member institutions in the low-to-mid-$20 million range, albeit with escalators for meeting subscriber quotas. On August 4, 2023, Oregon and Washington announced they would be following UCLA and USC to the Big Ten conference for the 2024 season. Later on that same day, Arizona, Arizona State, and Utah announced that they would follow Colorado to the Big 12 Conference starting in 2024. On September 1, 2023, California and Stanford announced their departure for the Atlantic Coast Conference starting in 2024.

In September 2023, Yahoo! Sports reported that the Pac-12 is "expected to operate as a two-member conference at least for [2024–25]" and would be recognized under a two-year grace period, until 2026, to meet conference requirements in the NCAA bylaws.

On September 8, 2023, Oregon State and Washington State filed a lawsuit against the Pac-12 and Kliavkoff in Washington State Superior Court for control of the conference and its assets. They contended that the departing schools, under the conference constitution, forfeited their right to participate in governing the conference by publicly declaring their intention to leave, and that if they retain control they might use it to dissolve the league and drain its millions of dollars in assets. On November 14, 2023, Judge Gary Libey of the Whitman County, Washington, Superior Court ruled in favor of the two schools. The University of Washington (UW) filed an emergency motion to keep the two schools from gaining full control of the conference for the 2023–24 academic year; a Washington Supreme Court commissioner granted UW's motion on November 28, 2023. However, this was overturned on December 15, 2023, by the Washington State Supreme Court, giving Oregon State and Washington State sole control of the Pac-12, meaning the departing schools will no longer be able to vote on conference decisions.

On December 5, 2023, Oregon State and Washington State announced that they had entered into a football alliance with the Mountain West Conference (MW) for the 2024 season. With the alliance, both programs will play three home games and three away games against MW opponents. The West Coast Conference (WCC) has invited both schools to join as affiliate members for basketball and most other non-football sports. Both partnerships are expected to last from the fall of 2024 to the spring of 2026. Washington State will also participate in the Mountain West for baseball, but Oregon State, a three-time College World Series champion, will become a baseball independent.

After the ten schools departed, the conference continued using the Pac-12 name and branding for at least the 2024–25 academic year. Oregon State and Washington State were nicknamed the "Pac-2" by media outlets, to the point that a game between the two teams during the 2023 football season was jokingly dubbed the "Pac-2 Championship Game" by fans.

=== Conference re-build and expansion (2024–2026) ===
Following the victory in the lawsuit, with sole access to all assets of the conference, Oregon State and Washington State were granted permission by the NCAA to act as a dormant conference for the 2024 and 2025 years while planning its future. If they had failed to meet membership requirements by July 1, 2026, the conference would have been disbanded.

Varsity teams for the two schools joined the West Coast Conference, Mountain West Conference, and Intercollegiate Rowing Association, depending on the sport, under temporary two-year agreements. Despite this, the Pac-12 sponsored six sports (football, men's and women's track and field, women's gymnastics, wrestling, and baseball). These teams functioned as independents and made heavy use of scheduling agreements with other conferences but acted under the Pac-12 banner and used Pac-12 promotional and broadcast material.

On September 12, 2024, it was announced that the conference would add four schools from the Mountain West: Boise State, Colorado State, Fresno State and San Diego State.

This violated an anti-poaching clause in the scheduling agreement contract between the Pac-12 and Mountain West, requiring an additional exit fee payment to the MW, but the Pac-12 filed a lawsuit, arguing that the penalties were extreme and violated antitrust laws.

With the conference now at six members and needing two more to get to the required number for FBS eligibility, the conference reached out to prospective members throughout mid-September, including American Conference members Memphis and Tulane, Mountain West member UNLV, and FBS Independent UConn. During this time, the conference also looked to add a member in Texas, targeting American members UTSA, North Texas, and Rice. It also looked for non-football teams. The West Coast Conference's Gonzaga was the Pac-12 top priority, followed by Saint Mary's and Creighton.

On September 23, 2024, Memphis, Tulane, USF, and UTSA released a joint statement, acknowledging interest by other conferences, but re-affirming their commitment to the American. UNLV also signed a grant of rights with the Mountain West, and so the Pac-12 regrouped, adding Utah State as its seventh conference member. Soon after, Utah State and Colorado State joined the anti-poaching lawsuit against the MW. Boise State also later joined.

On September 30, 2024, it was announced that Gonzaga would join the conference as its eighth full member, but since Gonzaga does not field football, the conference still needed an eighth football-playing member to retain FBS eligibility.

As the Pac-12 looked to add their final required member, Texas State, due to a host of preferred reasons, was largely seen as the favorite. New Mexico State, was floated around as a backup emergency option to get to FBS eligibility if talks with Texas State had fallen through. Saint Mary's (non-football) was also mentioned during this time to boost the conference's basketball abilities.

On June 30, 2025, it was announced that Texas State would join the Pac-12 as its ninth full member and eighth football member, cementing the conference's eligibility for the FBS. It was subsequently reported that the conference was also seeking at least one football-only affiliate to allow for an eight-game conference schedule, with Memphis, UTSA, and Rice named as potential candidates. In September 2025, it was reported that the Pac-12 was unlikely to add another football playing conference member by 2026, with the conference instead looking towards a timeframe of 2027 to add one of the previously discussed American Conference members. For 2026, the conference instead looked to enter a scheduling agreement with a fellow Group of Six conference, largely believed to be Conference USA, to get the same schedule benefits, to help all conference members get an additional game to help fill out their schedules, as most Pac-12 teams at this time had only scheduled 3–4 non-conference games, so combined with a 7-game conference slate, conference members only had 10–11 regular season games scheduled on the books. The Pac-12 would later adopt an in-conference "flex-game" model, the first of its kind in college football, to add the additional game to its members' schedules.

In September and October 2025, the conference acquired multiple affiliate members for specific "Olympic" sports. First, it was announced that the Dallas Baptist Patriots would join as a baseball-only member in 2027, moving from Conference USA. Then, the Southern Utah Thunderbirds were announced to be joining for women's gymnastics from the MPSF. Finally, the Northern Illinois Huskies were added for men's wrestling, joining from the MAC.

On March 30, 2026, the conference announced it had entered into a collaborative partnership with the Big West Conference for men's soccer beginning in the 2026 fall season. The three men's soccer programs in the Pac-12 (Gonzaga, Oregon State, and San Diego State) would be joined by four affiliate members from the Big West: Cal Poly, California Baptist, UC Riverside, and UC San Diego, giving both conferences 7 men's soccer programs. Additionally, the two conferences announced they would implement a scheduling collaboration, allowing for crossover matches between programs from both conferences. This arrangement allows both conferences to maintain their automatic bid to the NCAA Division I men's soccer tournament and sustain men's soccer opportunities in the western United States. This was followed 2 days later with the announcement that the conference would add four more affiliate members for men's wrestling: Air Force, Northern Colorado, North Dakota State, and South Dakota State. All four programs would come from the Big 12 Conference, where they previously competed as wrestling affiliates.

During the weekend of April 25–26, 2026, the Pac-12 soft-launched its new conference logo during the spring games of each football-playing conference member. The official launch would be on April 27 and it would be the first change to the conference's primary logo since 2011. This new logo is an evolution of the previous one with the biggest changes being the removal of the border, a change to the "A" font, a more modern font of the shield as a whole and a switch from the longtime conference color of blue to black to allow for more fiexibility with colors between each member schools.

=== Conference revival (2026–present) ===
On July 1, 2026, the Pac-12 re-launched as a nine member conference with the addition of seven new full-time members including Boise State University, California State University, Fresno (Fresno State), Colorado State University, Gonzaga University, San Diego State University, Texas State University and Utah State University.

As of September 4, 2026, the eight Pac-12 members will be eligible to participate in the Poinsettia Bowl and the Hawaii Bowl, along with ESPN Events bowls if more than 2 of the Pac-12's teams are bowl-eligible. The 2026 Poinsettia Bowl will feature the Pac-12 Champion against a Pac-12 legacy team. The 2026 Hawaii Bowl will include a Pac-12 team versus a Mountain West team.

== Financials ==
=== Conference distributions ===
The following table shows Pac 12 Conference distributions during the fiscal year beginning 07-01-2024 ending 06-30-2025 as reported by ProPublica using Schedule A of the Pac 12 Conference tax filing submitted on May 15, 2026.

Institution	2024–25 Distribution
Oregon State University	$29,345,794
Washington State University	$29,176,672
Average	$29,261,233

=== Athletic department revenue by school ===
Total revenue includes ticket sales, contributions and donations, rights and licensing, student fees, school funds and all other sources including TV income, camp income, concessions, and novelties.

Total expenses includes coach and staff salaries, scholarships, buildings and grounds, maintenance, utilities and rental fees, recruiting, team travel, equipment and uniforms, conference dues, and insurance.

The following table shows institutional reporting to the United States Department of Education as shown on the DOE Equity in Athletics website for the 2023–24 academic year.

Institution	2023–24 total revenue from athletics	2023–24 total expenses on athletics
Oregon State University	$120,225,018	$112,813,895
Washington State University	$89,041,553	$78,538,161
San Diego State University	$83,949,123	$83,949,123
Boise State University	$59,885,466	$59,885,465
California State University, Fresno	$55,761,420	$55,761,420
Colorado State University	$50,262,504	$50,262,504
Gonzaga University	$48,284,725	$38,587,088
Texas State University	$46,310,998	$46,310,998
Utah State University	$42,936,608	$42,936,608

=== CNBC list of the most valuable Pac-12 schools ===
Rankings as of December 19, 2025 (2024–2025 academic year)

Pac-12	NCAA	School	Valuation	Value Change	Revenue	Revenue Change
1	61	Oregon State Beavers	$440 million	▲35%	$120 million	▲30%
2	67	Washington State Cougars	$300 million	▼23%	$89 million	▲13%
3	69	San Diego State Aztecs	$270 million	▼6%	$91 million	▼13%
4	74	Boise State Broncos	$221 million	▲26%	$68 million	▲11%

== Apparel ==
School	Provider
Boise State	Nike
Fresno State	Adidas
Colorado State	Adidas,
Gonzaga	Nike
Oregon State	Nike, Asics (volleyball only)
San Diego State	Nike, Jordan Brand (basketball only)
Texas State	Adidas
Utah State	Nike
Washington State	Nike

== Commissioners ==
Since restarting in 1959 as the AAWU, the Pac-12 has had six commissioners:

Name	Years	Tenure	Conference name(s)
Thomas J. Hamilton	1959–1971	12 years	AAWU / Pacific-8
Wiles Hallock	1971–1983	12 years	Pacific-8 / Pacific-10
Thomas C. Hansen	1983–2009	26 years	Pacific-10
Larry Scott	2009–2021	12 years	Pacific-10 / Pac-12
George Kliavkoff	2021–2024	2 years	Pac-12
Teresa Gould	2024–present	2 years	Pac-12

=== PCC ===
Commissioners of the forerunner PCC:

- Herb Dana (193x–40)
- Edwin N. Atherton (1940–44)
- Victor O. Schmidt (1944–59)

== Facilities ==
School	Football stadium	Capacity	Basketball arena	Capacity	Baseball stadium	Capacity	Soccer stadium	Capacity
Boise State	Albertsons Stadium	36,387	ExtraMile Arena	12,480	Non-baseball school		Boas Soccer Complex	750
Colorado State	Canvas Stadium	41,000 (Note: Includes standing room. Seated capacity is 36,500.)	Moby Arena	8,745	Non-baseball school		CSU Soccer Field	3,000
Dallas Baptist	Baseball-only member				Horner Ballpark	3,492	Baseball-only member	
Fresno State	Valley Children's Stadium	40,727	Save Mart Center	15,544	Pete Beiden Field	5,757	Bulldog Soccer Stadium	1,000
Gonzaga	Non-football school		McCarthey Athletic Center	6,000	Patterson Baseball Complex	1,300	Luger Field	1,500
Oregon State	Reser Stadium	35,548	Gill Coliseum	9,604	Goss Stadium at Coleman Field	3,587	Lorenz Soccer Field	1,500
San Diego State	Snapdragon Stadium	35,000	Viejas Arena	12,414	Tony Gwynn Stadium	3,000	SDSU Sports Deck	1,500
Texas State	UFCU Stadium	27,149	Strahan Arena	10,000	Bobcat Ballpark	2,500	Bobcat Soccer Complex	500
Utah State	Maverik Stadium	25,513	Dee Glen Smith Spectrum	10,270	Non-baseball school		Chuck & Gloria Bell Soccer Field	1,000
Washington State	Martin Stadium	32,952	Beasley Coliseum	11,671	Bailey-Brayton Field	3,500	Lower Soccer Field	1,100

Men's soccer affiliates
School	Stadium	Capacity
California Baptist	CBU Soccer Stadium	500
Cal Poly	Mustang Memorial Field	11,075
UC Riverside	UCR Soccer Stadium	900
UC San Diego	Triton Soccer Stadium	1,750

== Key personnel ==
School	Athletic director	Football coach	Salary	Men's basketball coach	Salary	Women's basketball coach	Baseball coach	Softball coach	Women's volleyball coach
Boise State	Jeramiah Dickey	Spencer Danielson		Leon Rice		Gordy Presnell	No team	Andrew Rich	Shawn Garus
Colorado State	John Weber	Jim Mora		Ali Farokhmanesh		Ryun Williams	No team	Michelle Gascoigne	Emily Kohan
Dallas Baptist	Matt Duce	Baseball-only member					Dan Heefner	Baseball-only member	
Fresno State	Garrett Klassy	Matt Entz		Vance Walberg		Ryan McCarthy	Ryan Overland	Charlotte Morgan	Leisa Rosen
Gonzaga	Chris Standiford	No team	—N/a	Mark Few		Lisa Fortier	Mark Machtolf	No team	JT Wenger
Oregon State	Kevin Griffin	JaMarcus Shephard	TBD	Justin Joyner	$970,000	Scott Rueck	Mitch Canham	Laura Berg	Mark Barnard
San Diego State	John David Wicker	Sean Lewis		Brian Dutcher		Stacie Terry-Hutson	Kevin Vance	Stacey Nuveman-Deniz	Brent Hilliard
Texas State	Don Coryell	G. J. Kinne		Terrence Johnson		Chris Kielsmeier	Steven Trout	Ricci Woodard	Sean Huiet
Utah State	Cameron Walker	Bronco Mendenhall		Ben Jacobson		Wesley Brooks	No team	Shelby Thompson	Keith Smith
Washington State	Jon Haarlow	Kirby Moore	TBD	David Riley	TBA	Kamie Ethridge	Nathan Choate	No team	Korey Schroeder

Salaries based on 2026–27 academic year

== Championships ==
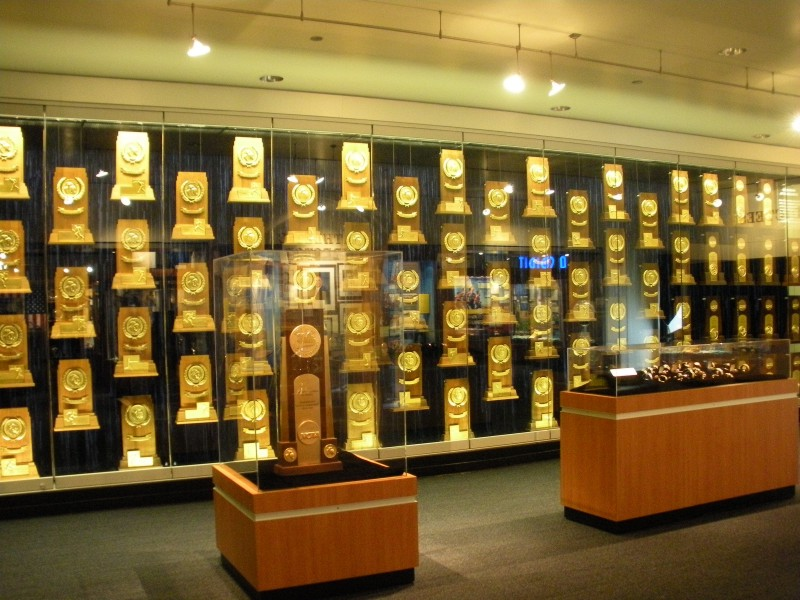
NCAA National Championship trophies, rings, watches won by UCLA teams when they were a member of the conference

=== National championships ===
The Pac-12 has won more NCAA team national championships than any other Division I conference since its founding in 1915. Although conference membership changed significantly during the 2021–2026 conference realignment, all championships won by former and current member institutions while they were members of the conference remain part of the conference's historical record.

The current Pac-12 membership entering the 2026–27 academic year has combined for the following NCAA team national championships:

School	Team				Individual			
School	Men	Women	Co-ed	Total	Men	Women	Co-ed	Total
Boise State	0	0	0	0	0	0	0	0
Colorado State	0	0	0	0	0	0	0	0
Fresno State	0	0	0	0	0	0	0	0
Gonzaga	0	0	0	0	0	0	0	0
Oregon State	4	0	0	4	32	7	0	39
San Diego State	0	0	0	0	0	0	0	0
Texas State	0	0	0	0	0	0	0	0
Utah State	0	0	0	0	0	0	0	0
Washington State	2	0	0	2	79	6	1	86
Conference total	6	0	0	6	111	13	1	125

These totals do not include football national championships, which the NCAA does not officially award at the FBS level. Various polls, formulas, and other third-party systems have been used to determine national championships, not all of which are universally accepted. These totals also do not include championships prior to the inception of NCAA championships in each sport.

=== Conference champions ===
- Football
- Men's basketball
- Women's basketball
- Baseball
- Softball
- Gymnastics
- Men's soccer
- Women's soccer
- Women's volleyball

==== Current champions ====
Season	Sport	Men's champion	Women's champion
Fall 2026	Cross Country	Gonzaga	Washington State
Fall 2026	Volleyball	–	
Fall 2026	Soccer		
Fall 2026	Football		–
Winter 2026–27	Swimming & Diving		
Winter 2026–27	Basketball		
Winter 2026–27	Wrestling		–
Winter 2026–27	Gymnastics	–	
Spring 2026	Golf		
Spring 2026	Tennis		
Spring 2026	Beach Volleyball	–	
Spring 2026	Lacrosse	–	
Spring 2026	Track & Field		
Spring 2026	Rowing		
Spring 2026	Softball	–	
Spring 2026	Baseball		–

==== NACDA Learfield Sports Directors' Cup rankings ====
The NACDA Learfield Sports Directors' Cup is an annual award given by the National Association of Collegiate Directors of Athletics to the U.S. colleges and universities with the most success in collegiate athletics.

Institution	2023– 24	2022– 23	2021– 22	2020– 21	2019– 20	2018– 19	2017– 18	2016– 17	2015– 16	2014– 15	2013– 14	10-yr Average
Boise State Broncos	–	–	–	–	N/A	–	–	–	–	–	–	–
Colorado State Rams	–	–	–	–	N/A	–	–	–	–	–	–	–
Fresno State Bulldogs	–	–	–	–	N/A	–	–	–	–	–	–	–
Gonzaga Bulldogs	–	–	–	–	N/A	–	–	–	–	–	–	–
Oregon State Beavers	58	58	51	55	N/A	65	60	69	81	65	75	64
San Diego State Aztecs	–	–	–	–	N/A	–	–	–	–	–	–	–
Texas State Bobcats	–	–	–	–	N/A	–	–	–	–	–	–	–
Utah State Aggies	–	–	–	–	N/A	–	–	–	–	–	–	–
Washington State Cougars	92	166	90	90	N/A	88	80	101	100	170	149	114

==== Capital One Cup rankings ====
The Capital One Cup is an annual award given by ESPN. Universities compete against each other by acquiring points throughout the school year based on how each individual sport teams finish in their respective sport. The sports are divided into two separate groups based on the popularity of the sport and the number of teams competing in the sport, with the group B sports group counting for 3 times the amount of points as group A. There are two separate cups for both the men & women. The winning schools receive $200,000 to their student athlete scholarship fund.

Men's

Institution	2023– 24	2022– 23	2021– 22	2020– 21	2019– 20	2018– 19	2017– 18	2016– 17	2015– 16	2014– 15	2013– 14	2012– 13	2011– 12	2010– 11
Boise State Broncos	–	–	–	–	N/A	–	–	–	–	–	–	–	–	–
Colorado State Rams	–	–	–	–	N/A	–	–	–	–	–	–	–	–	–
Fresno State Bulldogs	–	–	–	–	N/A	–	–	–	–	–	–	–	–	–
Gonzaga Bulldogs	–	–	–	–	N/A	–	–	–	–	–	–	–	–	–
Oregon State Beavers	22	–	38	–	N/A	–	8	22	–	–	–	31	96	5
San Diego State Aztecs	–	–	–	–	N/A	–	–	–	–	–	–	–	–	–
Texas State Bobcats	–	–	–	–	N/A	–	–	–	–	–	–	–	–	–
Utah State Aggies	–	–	–	–	N/A	–	–	–	–	–	–	–	–	–
Washington State Cougars	–	–	–	–	N/A	88	–	–	–	–	–	–	–	–

Women's

Institution	2023– 24	2022– 23	2021– 22	2020– 21	2019– 20	2018– 19	2017– 18	2016– 17	2015– 16	2014– 15	2013– 14	2012– 13	2011– 12	2010– 11
Boise State Broncos	–	–	–	–	N/A	–	–	–	–	–	–	–	–	–
Colorado State Rams	–	–	–	–	N/A	–	–	–	–	–	–	–	–	–
Fresno State Bulldogs	–	–	–	–	N/A	–	–	–	–	–	–	–	–	–
Gonzaga Bulldogs	–	–	–	–	N/A	–	–	–	–	–	–	–	–	–
Oregon State Beavers	60	–	56	–	N/A	55	49	55	24	–	–	–	–	–
San Diego State Aztecs	–	–	–	–	N/A	–	–	–	–	–	–	–	–	–
Texas State Bobcats	–	–	–	–	N/A	–	–	–	–	–	–	–	–	–
Utah State Aggies	–	–	–	–	N/A	–	–	–	–	–	–	–	–	–
Washington State Cougars	–	–	–	–	N/A	–	–	–	–	71	–	–	–	–

== Sports ==
The Pac-12 Conference sponsors championship competition in eight men's sports and eleven women's NCAA-sanctioned sports. Thirteen schools are associate members, each in a single men's or women’s sport.

Pac-12 teams in conference competition
Sport	Men's	Women's
Baseball	7	–
Basketball	9	9
Cross country	7	9
Football	8	–
Golf	9	8
Gymnastics	–	3 (4 in 2027–28)
Soccer	3	9
Softball	–	7
Swimming & Diving	–	4
Tennis	4	8
Track & Field Outdoor	7	9
Volleyball	–	9
Wrestling	1	–

=== Men's sponsored sports by Pac-12 schools ===
Member-by-member sponsorship of men's sports sponsored by Pac-12 schools that have been announced as being sponsored by the Pac-12 in 2026–27.

School	Baseball	Basketball	Cross Country	Football	Golf	Soccer	Tennis	Track & field outdoor	Wrestling	Total sports
Full members
Boise State	No	Yes	Yes	Yes	Yes	No	Yes	Yes	No	6
Colorado State	No	Yes	Yes	Yes	Yes	No	No	Yes	No	5
Fresno State	Yes	Yes	Yes	Yes	Yes	No	No	Yes	No	6
Gonzaga	Yes	Yes	Yes	No	Yes	Yes	Yes	Yes	No	7
Oregon State	Yes	Yes	No	Yes	Yes	Yes	No	No	Yes	6
San Diego State	Yes	Yes	No	Yes	Yes	Yes	Yes	No	No	6
Texas State	Yes	Yes	Yes	Yes	Yes	No	No	Yes	No	6
Utah State	No	Yes	Yes	Yes	Yes	No	Yes	Yes	No	6
Washington State	Yes	Yes	Yes	Yes	Yes	No	No	Yes	No	6
Affiliate members
Air Force									Yes	1
California Baptist						Yes (Note: Despite being a full member of the Big West Conference, which sponsors men's soccer, the two leagues reached an agreement to help preserve the Pac-12's auto-bid in men's soccer. Thus the team will compete in Pac-12 conference play.)				1
Cal Poly						Yes			Yes	2
CSU Bakersfield									Yes	1
Dallas Baptist	Yes									1
Little Rock									Yes	1
Northern Colorado									Yes	1
Northern Illinois									Yes	1
North Dakota State									Yes	1
South Dakota State									Yes	1
UC Riverside						Yes				1
UC San Diego						Yes (Note: UC San Diego will play Pac-12 men's soccer in the 2026 season only. In July 2027, it will join the West Coast Conference, which sponsors the sport. The Pac-12 will still have sufficient membership to retain its NCAA tournament automatic bid.)				1
Current Totals	6+1	9	7	8	9	3+4	4	7	1+8	54+13
2027–28 Totals	6+1	9	7	8	9	3+3	4	7	1+8	54+12

==== Men's sports not sponsored by the Pac-12 ====
School	Rowing (Note: Not an NCAA sport.)	Track & field indoor
Boise State		MPSF
Colorado State		MPSF
Gonzaga	MPSF	MPSF
Oregon State	MPSF	
Texas State		MPSF
Utah State		MPSF
Washington State		MPSF

=== Women's sponsored sports by Pac-12 schools ===
Member-by-member sponsorship of women's sports sponsored by Pac-12 schools that have been announced as being sponsored by the Pac-12 in 2026–27.

School	Basketball	Cross country	Golf	Gymnastics	Soccer	Softball	Swimming & diving	Tennis	Track & field outdoor	Volleyball (indoor)	Total sports
Full members
Boise State	Yes	Yes	Yes	Yes	Yes	Yes	No	Yes	Yes	Yes	9
Colorado State	Yes	Yes	Yes	No	Yes	Yes	Yes	Yes	Yes	Yes	9
Fresno State	Yes	Yes	Yes	No	Yes	Yes	Yes	Yes	Yes	Yes	9
Gonzaga	Yes	Yes	Yes	No	Yes	No	No	Yes	Yes	Yes	7
Oregon State	Yes	Yes	Yes	Yes	Yes	Yes	No	No	Yes	Yes	8
San Diego State	Yes	Yes	Yes	No	Yes	Yes	Yes	Yes	Yes	Yes	9
Texas State	Yes	Yes	Yes	No (Note: Texas State will add women's gymnastics in 2027–28.)	Yes	Yes	No	Yes	Yes	Yes	8
Utah State	Yes	Yes	No	Yes	Yes	Yes	No	Yes	Yes	Yes	8
Washington State	Yes	Yes	Yes	No	Yes	No	Yes	Yes	Yes	Yes	8
Affiliate members
Cal Baptist							Yes				1
Southern Utah				Yes							1
Current Totals	9	9	8	3+1	9	7	4+1	8	9	9	75+2
2027–28 Totals	9	9	8	4+1	9	7	4+1	8	9	9	76+2

==== Women's sports not sponsored by the Pac-12 ====
School	Equestrian (Note: Currently part of the NCAA Emerging Sports for Women program.)	Lacrosse	Rowing	Track & field indoor	Volleyball (beach)	Water polo
Boise State				MPSF	Big 12	
Colorado State				MPSF		
Fresno State	Big 12			MPSF		GCC (Note: Joining the Big West in 2027.)
Gonzaga			TBD (Note: Has not announced official affiliation for Rowing since officially joining Pac-12. Last competed in WCC.)	MPSF		
Oregon State			TBD	MPSF		
San Diego State		Big 12		MPSF		GCC
Texas State				MPSF		
Utah State				MPSF		
Washington State			TBD	MPSF		

== Football ==
=== All-time school records ===
This list goes through the 2025 season.

#	Team	Records	Pct.	Division championships	Pac-12 championships	Claimed national championships
1	Fresno State	660–457–27	.589	5	0	0
2	San Diego State	604–460–32	.566	6	0	3
3	Washington State	587–597–45	.496	1	4	0
4	Utah State	583–582–31	.500	2	0	0
5	Oregon State	571–634–50	.475	0	6	0
6	Colorado State	549–631–33	.466	0	0	0
7	Texas State	548–511–25	.517	0	0	2
8	Boise State	511–194–2	.724	6	0	1

Number of Claimed National Championships, as well as win–loss–tie records, include all seasons played, regardless of conference membership.

=== Rivalries ===
- The Battle For The Milk Can – The Milk Can Trophy is awarded to the winning athletic department between Boise State and Fresno State.
- The Battle For The Old Oil Can – The Old Oil Can Trophy is awarded to the winning athletic department between the two California schools.
- Oregon State–Washington State football rivalry – The game between Oregon State and Washington State is one of the most played rivalries in NCAA football, historically being a part of the Northwest Championship. The individual matchup between the two schools gained notoriety following the collapse of the Pac-12. The matchup has not been officially named yet, with suggestions including "The Land-Grant Rivalry", "The Cascade Cup", or "The Columbia River Rivalry". The winning alumni association receives the "No Name Trophy".
- Snake River Rivalry – Boise State and Washington State have developed a fast rivalry, due to the schools' proximity, and the success of the two programs, spurred on by Boise State's move to the Pac-12.

Rivalry name	Standings
The Battle For The Milk Can	Boise State leads, 17–9
The Battle For The Old Oil Can	San Diego State leads, 31–27–4
Pac-2 Championship / Battle For The No Name Trophy / Northwest Championship (Note: The Oregon State–Washington State football rivalry does not have an official name or commonly agreed upon name by the fanbases.)	Washington State leads, 58-51-3
Snake River Rivalry	Washington State leads, 5-3

The most frequently played rivalry in the conference is between Oregon State and Washington State with 112 meetings through October 2026. This rivalry is one of the most-played rivalries in college football.

=== Bowl games ===
The following is the selection order of bowl games with Pac-12 tie-ins as of the 2026 college football season. Due to the nature of the conference, the Pac-12 bowl tie ins are split between the 12 legacy and 6 new members. If a Pac-12 team, legacy or current, is selected to participate in the College Football Playoff, all other bowl-eligible teams move up one spot in the order.

Pick	Name	Location	Opposing conference	Opposing pick
1	Alamo Bowl	San Antonio, Texas	Big 12	2
2	Las Vegas Bowl	Las Vegas, Nevada	SEC or Big Ten	3-8(SEC)/4(Big Ten)
3	Holiday Bowl	San Diego, California	ACC	2-4
4	Sun Bowl	El Paso, Texas	ACC	5-7
5	Poinsettia Bowl	San Diego, California	Legacy Pac-12 (Big Ten, Big 12, ACC)	5
6	Independence Bowl	Shreveport, Louisiana	Big 12	7
7	Hawaii Bowl	Honolulu, Hawaii	MWC	Hawaii or 3
8	ESPN Events Bowls	Misc.	All FBS Conferences	Last

=== Legacy Pac-12 ===
==== Divisions ====
On October 21, 2010, the Pac-10 announced the creation of divisions and a championship game in football, to be used when Colorado and Utah joined the conference effective July 1, 2011. The twelve members were split into two divisions for football only: a North Division comprising the Pacific Northwest and Bay Area schools, and a South Division comprising the Mountain Time Zone and Los Angeles schools.

A nine-game conference schedule was maintained, with five games within the assigned division and four games from the opposite division. The four California teams, noted in the table in gray, still played each other every season— consequently, the four non-California teams in each division will only play one of the two California teams from the opposite division each year.

The Pac-12 Football Championship Game featured the North Division Champion against the South Division Champion for the first 11 years of its existence, with divisional champions determined based on record in all conference games (both divisional and cross-divisional). However, on May 18, 2022, the NCAA Division I Council announced that conferences would no longer be required to maintain divisions in order to hold a conference championship. As a result, later that same day, the Pac-12 announced that it would eliminate its divisions for the 2022 football season and beyond, with the championship game instead featuring the two Pac-12 teams with the highest winning percentage. It was the first FBS conference to scrap its divisions as a result of this change.

North Division	South Division
Oregon	Arizona
Oregon State	Arizona State
Washington	Colorado
Washington State	Utah
California	UCLA
Stanford	USC

==== Bowl games ====
The following was the selection order of bowl games with Pac-12 tie-ins in the 2024 college football season, the last season of the Legacy Pac-12. If a Pac-12 team was selected to participate in the College Football Playoff, all other bowl-eligible teams moved up one spot in the order.

Pick	Name	Location	Opposing conference	Opposing pick
1	Rose Bowl	Pasadena, California	Big Ten	1
2	Alamo Bowl	San Antonio, Texas	Big 12	2
3	Holiday Bowl	San Diego, California	ACC	3
4	Las Vegas Bowl	Las Vegas, Nevada	SEC or Big Ten	3(SEC)/4(Big Ten)
5	LA Bowl	Los Angeles, California	MWC	1
6	Sun Bowl	El Paso, Texas	ACC	7
7 (2020, 2023, 2024)	Independence Bowl	Shreveport, Louisiana	NCAA Division I FBS independent schools	Army in 2020 and 2024, BYU in 2023

==== Pac-12 All-Century Football Team ====
In honor of the 100th anniversary of the establishment of the conference, an All-Century Team was unveiled on December 2, 2015, voted on by a panel of coaches, players, and the media.

- Quarterbacks: John Elway, Stanford; Marcus Mariota, Oregon; Jim Plunkett, Stanford; Andrew Luck, Stanford; Matt Leinart, USC
- Running backs: Marcus Allen, USC; O. J. Simpson, USC; Charles White, USC; Reggie Bush, USC; Mike Garrett, USC
- Wide receivers: Keyshawn Johnson, USC; Lynn Swann, USC; Marqise Lee, USC; J. J. Stokes, UCLA; Ken Margerum, Stanford
- Tight ends: Tony Gonzalez, California; Charle Young, USC;
- Offensive line: Jonathan Ogden, UCLA; Ron Yary, USC; Tony Boselli, USC; Anthony Muñoz, USC; Lincoln Kennedy, Washington; Brad Budde, USC; Randall McDaniel, Arizona State
- Defensive ends: Tedy Bruschi, Arizona; Terrell Suggs, Arizona State; Willie McGinest, USC; Andre Carter, California; Jim Jeffcoat, Arizona State
- Defensive tackles: Steve Emtman, Washington; Haloti Ngata, Oregon; Rob Waldrop, Arizona; Leonard Williams, USC; Ed White, California
- Linebackers Junior Seau, USC; Jerry Robinson, UCLA; Ricky Hunley, Arizona; Richard Wood, USC; Chris Claiborne, USC
- Cornerbacks Joey Browner, USC; Mel Renfro, Oregon; Chris McAlister, Arizona; Antoine Cason, Arizona
- Safeties: Ronnie Lott, USC; Kenny Easley, UCLA; Troy Polamalu, USC; Mark Carrier, USC
- Kicker: Jason Hanson, Washington State
- Punter: Tom Hackett, Utah
- Returner: Reggie Bush, USC
- Coach: John McKay, USC

Note: Bold Italic notes Offensive, Defensive and Coach of the Century selections. The voting panel was made up of 119 former players, coaches and media.

== Men's basketball ==
As of 2026, Pac-12 schools have won 15 Division I national titles. This was tied with the Atlantic Coast Conference for the most of any conference. Oregon won the first NCAA tournament in 1939. UCLA has won 11 national titles, the most of any Division I team. Arizona has won the most recent national title, winning in 1997. Stanford in 1942, Utah in 1944 and California in 1959 are the other NCAA champions.

#	Pac-12	Overall record	Pct.	Pac-12 regular-season championships	Pac-12 tournament championships	NCAA national championships	Claimed pre-tournament championships
1	Oregon State Beavers	1797–1417–0	.559	12	1	0	0
2	Utah State Aggies	1714–1156–0	.597	0	0	0	0
3	Washington State Cougars	1665–1585–0	.512	2	0	0	1
4	San Diego State Aztecs	1485–1125–1	.569	0	0	0	0
5	Gonzaga Bulldogs	1426–713–0	.667	0	0	0	0
6	Texas State Bobcats	1423–1245–0	.533	0	0	0	0
7	Colorado State Rams	1415–1350–0	.512	0	0	0	0
8	Fresno State Bulldogs	1413–1236–0	.533	0	0	0	0
9	Boise State Broncos	990–737–0	.573	0	0	0	0

=== National championships, Final Fours, and NCAA tournament appearances ===
Pac-12 Conference basketball programs have combined to win 15 NCAA men's basketball championships as Pac-12 members, with another member having won a national championship before joining the conference. UCLA has won 11 national championships with Arizona, California, Oregon, Stanford winning one each as Pac-12 members, and Utah winning one national championship as a member of the Mountain States Conference. Eleven of the twelve legacy Pac-12 schools advanced to at least one Final Four before the 2024 mass departure, with Arizona State the only school that had not made an appearance. Current members Gonzaga and San Diego State have also reached the Final Four.

Current members of the Big Ten
Current members of the Big 12
Current members of the ACC

School	Men's NCAA championships	Men's NCAA Final Fours	Men's NCAA Elite Eights	Men's NCAA Sweet Sixteens	Men's NCAA tournament appearances
Arizona Wildcats	1 (1997)	4 (1988, 1994, 1997, 2001)	11 (1976, 1988, 1994, 1997, 1998, 2001, 2003, 2005, 2011, 2014, 2015)	21 (1951, 1976, 1988, 1989, 1991, 1994, 1996–1998, 2001–2003, 2005, 2009, 2011, 2013–2015, 2017, 2022, 2024)	38 (1951, 1976, 1977, 1985–2009, 2011, 2013–2018*, 2022–2024)
Arizona State Sun Devils			3 (1961, 1963, 1975)	5 (1961, 1963, 1973, 1975, 1995*)	17 (1958, 1961–1964, 1973, 1975, 1980, 1981, 1991, 1995, 2003, 2009, 2014, 2018, 2019, 2023)
Boise State Broncos					10 (1976, 1988, 1993, 1994, 2008, 2013, 2015, 2022–2024)
California Golden Bears	1 (1959)	3 (1946, 1959, 1960)	5 (1946, 1957–1960)	6 (1957–1960, 1993, 1997)	19 (1946, 1957–1960, 1990, 1993, 1994, 1996*, 1997, 2001–2003, 2006, 2009, 2010, 2012, 2013, 2016)
Colorado Buffaloes		2 (1942, 1955)	6 (1940, 1942, 1946, 1955, 1962, 1963)	5 (1954, 1955, 1962, 1963, 1969)	16 (1940, 1942, 1946, 1954, 1955, 1962, 1963, 1969, 1997, 2003, 2012–2014, 2016, 2021, 2024)
Colorado State Rams			1 (1969)	2 (1964, 1969)	13 (1954, 1963, 1965, 1966, 1969, 1989, 1990, 2003, 2012, 2013, 2022, 2024, 2025)
Fresno State Bulldogs				1 (1982)	5 (1981, 1982, 1984, 2000 (vacated), 2001, 2016)
Gonzaga Bulldogs		2 (2017, 2021)	6 (1999, 2013, 2017, 2019, 2021, 2023)	14 (1999–2001, 2006, 2009, 2015–2019, 2021–2024)	33 (1995, 1999–2019, 2021–2025)
Oregon Ducks	1 (1939)	2 (1939, 2017)	7 (1939, 1945, 1960, 2002, 2007, 2016, 2017)	8 (1960, 2002, 2007, 2013, 2016, 2017, 2019, 2021)	18 (1939, 1945, 1960, 1961, 1995, 2000, 2002, 2003, 2007, 2008, 2013–2017, 2019, 2021, 2024)
Oregon State Beavers		2 (1949, 1963)	8 (1947, 1949, 1955, 1962, 1963, 1966, 1982*, 2021)	7 (1955, 1962, 1963, 1966, 1975, 1982*, 2021)	18 (1947, 1949, 1955, 1962–1964, 1966, 1975, 1980*–1982*, 1984, 1985, 1988–1990, 2016, 2021)
San Diego State Aztecs		1 (2023)	1 (2023)	4 (2011, 2014, 2023, 2024)	17 (1975, 1976, 1985, 2002, 2006, 2010–2015, 2018, 2021–2025)
Stanford Cardinal	1 (1942)	2 (1942, 1998)	3 (1942, 1998, 2001)	5 (1997, 1998, 2001, 2008, 2014)	17 (1942, 1989, 1992, 1995–2005, 2007, 2008, 2014)
Texas State Bobcats					2 (1994, 1997)
UCLA Bruins	11 (1964–1965, 1967–1973, 1975, 1995)	19 (1962, 1964–1965, 1967–1976, 1976, 1980*, 1995, 2006–2008, 2021)	23 (1950, 1962, 1964–1965, 1967–1976, 1979–1980*, 1992, 1995, 1997, 2006–2008, 2021)	37 (1952, 1956, 1962–1965, 1967–1980*, 1990, 1992, 1995, 1997–1998, 2000–2002, 2006–2008, 2014–2015, 2017, 2021–2023)	46 (1950, 1952, 1956, 1962–1965, 1967–1981, 1983, 1987, 1989–2002, 2005–2009, 2011, 2013–2015, 2017–2018, 2021–2023)
USC Trojans		2 (1940, 1954)	4 (1940, 1954, 2001, 2021)	5 (1954, 1961, 2001, 2007*, 2021)	21 (1940, 1954, 1960–1961, 1979, 1982, 1985, 1991–1992, 1997, 2001–2002, 2007*–2009, 2011, 2016–2017, 2021–2023)
Utah Utes	1 (1944)	4 (1944, 1961, 1966, 1998)	6 (1944, 1956, 1961, 1966, 1997, 1998)	16 (1955, 1956, 1959–1961, 1966, 1977, 1978, 1981, 1983, 1991, 1996–1998, 2005, 2015)	29 (1944, 1945, 1955, 1956, 1959–1961, 1966, 1977–1979, 1981, 1983, 1986, 1991, 1993, 1995–2000, 2002–2005, 2009, 2015, 2016)
Utah State Aggies			2 (1939, 1970)	3 (1962, 1964, 1970)	25 (1939, 1962–1964, 1970, 1971, 1975, 1979, 1980, 1983, 1988, 1998, 2000, 2001, 2003, 2005, 2006, 2009–2011, 2019, 2021–2025)
Washington Huskies		1 (1953)	4 (1943, 1948, 1951, 1953)	7 (1951, 1953, 1984, 1998, 2005, 2006, 2010)	17 (1943, 1948, 1951, 1953, 1976, 1984–1986, 1998, 1999, 2004–2006, 2009–2011, 2019)
Washington State Cougars		1 (1941)	1 (1941)	1 (2008)	7 (1941, 1980, 1983, 1994, 2007, 2008, 2024)

Seasons are listed by the calendar years in which they ended. Italics indicate honors earned before the school competed in the Pac-12.

=== NCAA tournament champions, runners-up and locations ===
† denotes overtime games. Multiple †'s indicate more than one overtime.

Year	Champion		Runner-up		Venue and city	
1939	Oregon	46	Ohio State	33	Patten Gymnasium	Evanston, Illinois
1941	Wisconsin	39	Washington State	34	Municipal Auditorium	Kansas City, Missouri
1942	Stanford	53	Dartmouth	38	Municipal Auditorium	Kansas City, Missouri (2)
1944†	Utah	42	Dartmouth	40	Madison Square Garden	New York City, New York
1959	California	71	West Virginia	70	Freedom Hall	Louisville, Kentucky
1960	Ohio State	75	California	55	Cow Palace	Daly City, California
1964	UCLA	76	Duke	72	Municipal Auditorium	Kansas City, Missouri (3)
1965	UCLA	91	Michigan	80	Veterans Memorial Coliseum	Portland, Oregon
1967	UCLA	79	Dayton	64	Freedom Hall	Louisville, Kentucky (2)
1968	UCLA	78	North Carolina	55	Los Angeles Memorial Sports Arena	Los Angeles, California
1969	UCLA	92	Purdue	72	Freedom Hall	Louisville, Kentucky (3)
1970	UCLA	80	Jacksonville	69	Cole Field House	College Park, Maryland
1971	UCLA	68	Villanova	62	Astrodome	Houston, Texas
1972	UCLA	81	Florida State	76	Los Angeles Memorial Sports Arena	Los Angeles, California (2)
1973	UCLA	87	Memphis State	66	St. Louis Arena	St. Louis, Missouri
1975	UCLA	92	Kentucky	85	San Diego Sports Arena	San Diego, California
1980	Louisville	59	UCLA	54	Market Square Arena	Indianapolis, Indiana
1995	UCLA	89	Arkansas	78	Kingdome	Seattle, Washington
1997 †	Arizona	84	Kentucky	79	RCA Dome	Indianapolis, Indiana (2)
1998	Kentucky	78	Utah	69	Alamodome	San Antonio, Texas
2001	Duke	82	Arizona	72	H.H.H. Metrodome	Minneapolis, Minnesota
2006	Florida	73	UCLA	54	RCA Dome	Indianapolis, Indiana (3)

=== Post-season NIT championships and runners-up ===
Year	Champion		Runner-up		MVP	Venue and city	
1940	Colorado	51	Duquesne University	40	Bob Doll, Colorado	Madison Square Garden	New York City
1947	Utah	49	Kentucky	45	Vern Gardner, Utah	Madison Square Garden	New York City
1974	Purdue	87	Utah	81	Mike Sojourner, Utah	Madison Square Garden	New York City
1985	UCLA	65	Indiana	62	Reggie Miller, UCLA	Madison Square Garden	New York City
1991	Stanford	78	Oklahoma	72	Adam Keefe, Stanford	Madison Square Garden	New York City
1999	California	61	Clemson	60	Sean Lampley, California	Madison Square Garden	New York City
2012	Stanford	75	Minnesota	51	Aaron Bright, Stanford	Madison Square Garden	New York City
2015	Stanford	66^{OT}	Miami (FL)	64	Chasson Randle, Stanford	Madison Square Garden	New York City
2018	Penn State	82	Utah	66	Lamar Stevens, Penn State	Madison Square Garden	New York City

== See also ==
- List of colleges and universities in the United States by endowment
