= Steven J. Bleymaier =

US Air Force brigadier general (born 1968)

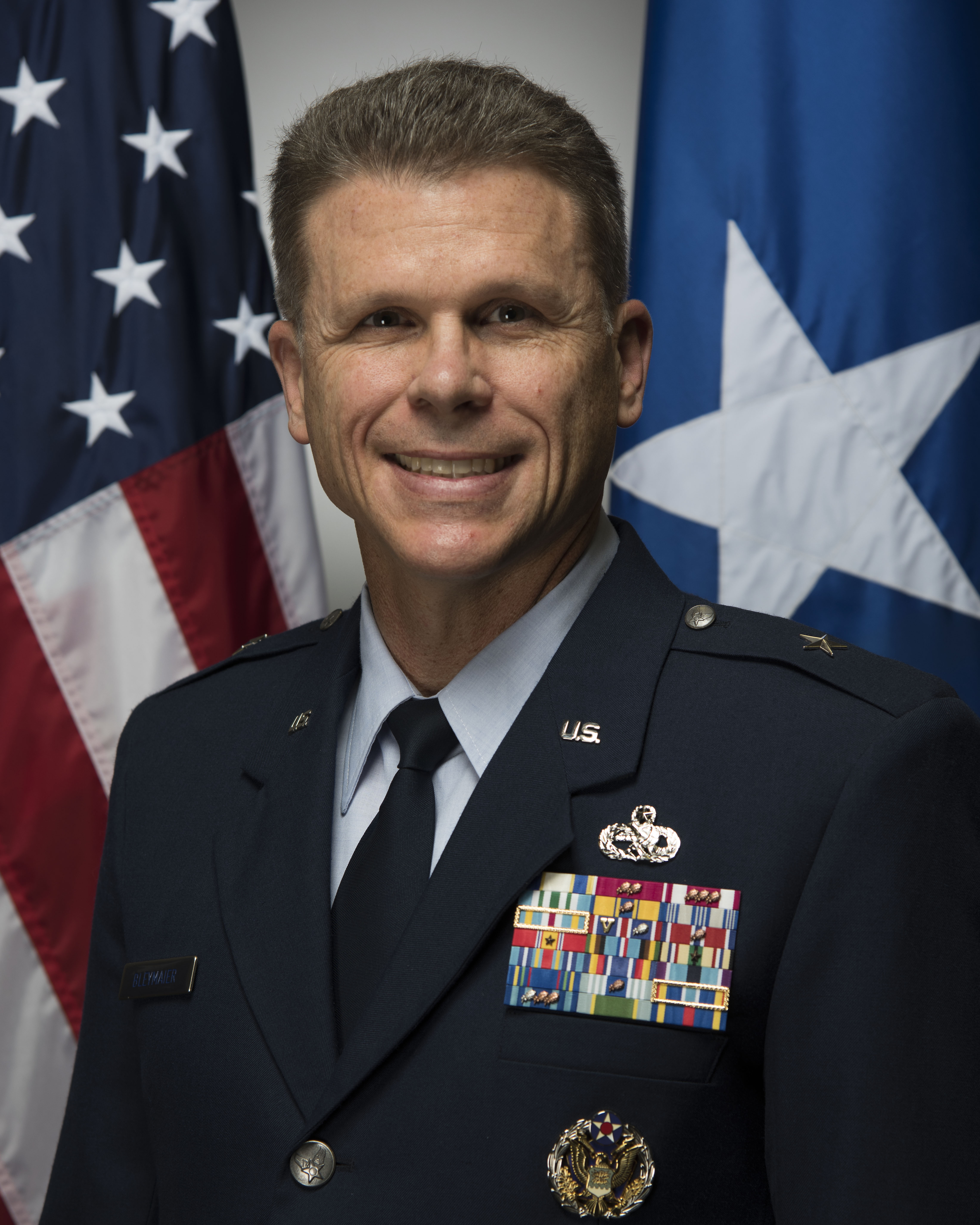
- Born: 17 November 1968
- Relatives: Joseph S. Bleymaier (grandfather)
- Military career
- Allegiance: United States
- Branch: United States Air Force
- Service years: 1991–2019
- Rank: Brigadier General
- Commands: Ogden Air Logistics Complex; 72nd Air Base Wing; Oklahoma City Air Logistics Center; 20th Maintenance Group; 376th Expeditionary Aircraft Maintenance Squadron; 366th Equipment Maintenance Squadron
- Conflicts: War on terrorism War in Afghanistan (2001-2021)
- Awards: Air Force Distinguished Service Medal; Legion of Merit (3); Meritorious Service Medal (4); Joint Service Commendation Medal; Air Force Commendation Medal (2); Air Force Achievement Medal
- Other work: Vice President of Global Strategy and Government Programs, Ansys

Steven Joseph Bleymaier (born 17 November 1968) is a retired United States Air Force brigadier general. He graduated from the United States Air Force Academy in 1991. He served two tours of duty in Germany and three in the Middle East.

== Biography ==
Steven Joseph Bleymaier was born on 17 November 1968. He graduated from the United States Air Force Academy in Colorado Springs, Colorado, with a Bachelor of Science degree, and was commissioned as a second lieutenant in the United States Air Force (USAF) on 29 May 1991. He completed the Aircraft Maintenance and Munitions Officers Course at Chanute Air Force Base, Illinois, from September to December 1991.

Bleymaier was Accessories Flight Commander and Avionics Flight Commander with the 48th Component Repair Squadron at RAF Lakenheath in England from January 1992 until June 1993. He was promoted to first lieutenant on 29 May 1993. He was the Assistant Sortie Generator Flight Commander and Sortie Support Flight Commander of the 494th Fighter Squadron there from June 1993 to April 1994, before returning to the 48th Equipment Maintenance Squadron as Assistant Munitions Flight Commander until August 1995. He was promoted to captain on 29 May 1995, and earned a Master of Aeronautical Science degree that year from Embry-Riddle Aeronautical University.

Returning to the United States, Bleymaier was chief of the Site Activation and Field Support Branch in the Advanced Medium-Range Air-to-Air Missile, Air-to-Air Joint System Program Office at Eglin Air Force Base in Florida from August 1995 to June 1997.He graduated from the Squadron Officer School, at Maxwell Air Force Base in Alabama, and was an intern at Headquarters U.S. Air Force, in Arlington, Virginia, from July 1997 to May 1999. He earned a Master of Arts degree in Organizational Management from The George Washington University in Washington, D.C.

From January 1998 to December 1998, he was an Action Officer in the Congressional Inquiries and Congressional Actions Divisions, in the office of the Secretary of the Air Force for Legislative Liaison and was a Politico-Military Planner and the Slovenia Desk Officer with the Central and Eastern European Division, J-5/Strategic Plans and Policy, with the Joint Staff at the Pentagon.

Bleymaier was the maintenance supervisor of the 1st Equipment Maintenance Squadron at Langley Air Force Base in Virginia from May 1999 to May 2000, and then the squadron maintenance officer of the 94th Fighter Squadron there from until April 2002. He was promoted to major on 1 April 2002. A second tour of duty in Europe followed, this time as the deputy chief of the Aircraft Maintenance Division of the Logistics Directorate at Headquarters U.S. Air Forces in Europe at Ramstein Air Base in Germany from April 2002 to July 2003. He then returned to the United States, where he earned a Master of Military Operational Art and Science degree from the Air Command and Staff College at Maxwell Air Force Base.

Promoted to lieutenant colonel on 1 March 2006, Bleymaier commanded the 366th Equipment Maintenance Squadron at Mountain Home Air Force Base in Idaho from June 2004 to July 2006, and also commanded the 376th Expeditionary Aircraft Maintenance Squadron, and was deputy commander, 376th Expeditionary Maintenance Group at Manas Air Base in Kyrgyzstan from January 2006 to May 2006. He deployed to the Middle East three times. He was action officer in the Aircraft Maintenance Directorate in the office of the Deputy Chief of Staff for Logistics, Installations and Mission Support at Headquarters U.S. Air Force from July 2006 to July 2007, and executive officer to the Assistant Vice Chief of Staff there from July 2007 to August 2008. From August 2008 to June 2009, he was a student at the National War College at Fort Lesley J. McNair in Washington, D.C., where he earned a fourth master's degree, a Master of Science. He then assumed command of the 20th Maintenance Group at Shaw Air Force Base in South Carolina. He was promoted to colonel on 1 October 2009.

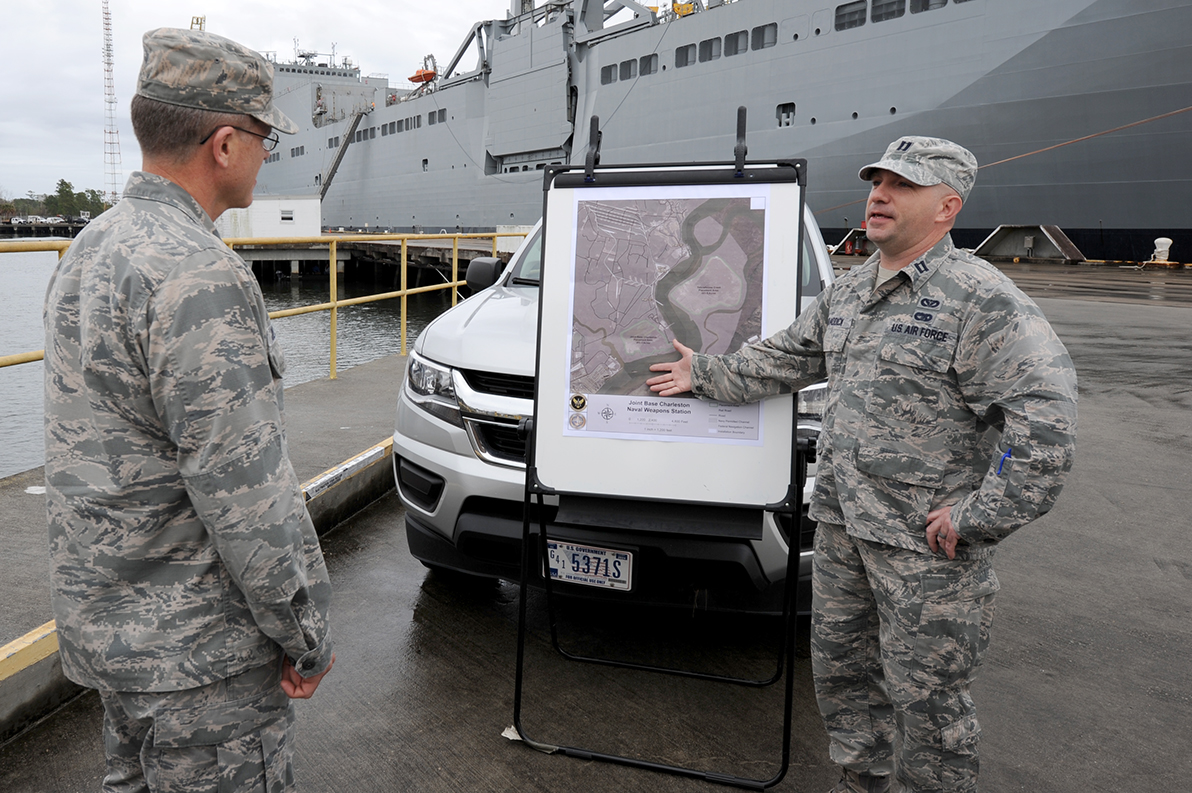
U.S. Air Force Captain Steven Braddick (right), 628th Civil Engineer Squadron Weapons Station element chief, briefs Bleymaier about the importance of dredging every eighteen months so prepositioned ships can enter Wharf Alpha at Joint Base Charleston

From May 2011 to January 2012, Bleymaier was Vice Commander of the Oklahoma City Air Logistics Center and Air Force Director of Propulsion at Tinker Air Force Base in Oklahoma. He then commanded the 72nd Air Base Wing there from January 2012 to July 2013. He was the Deputy Director for Logistics-Sustainment at the Headquarters Air Force Materiel Command at Wright-Patterson Air Force Base in Ohio from July 2013 to August 2014, and the Director of Staff at the Headquarters Air Force Materiel Command from August 2014 to August 2015. He was promoted to brigadier general on 2 August 2015, and commanded the Ogden Air Logistics Complex at Hill Air Force Base in Utah from August 2015 to August 2017. His final assignment was as the Director of Logistics, Engineering and Force Protection at Headquarters Air Mobility Command at Scott Air Force Base in Illinois, for which he was awarded the Air Force Distinguished Service Medal. He retired from the USAF on 1 September 2019.

His decorations and awards include the Air Force Distinguished Service Medal, the Legion of Merit with two oak leaf clusters, the Meritorious Service Medal with three oak leaf clusters, the Joint Service Commendation Medal, the Air Force Commendation Medal with an oak leaf cluster, the Air Force Achievement Medal, and the Air Force Organizational Excellence Award with an oak leaf cluster.

After leaving the USAF, Bleymaier became the Vice President of Global Strategy and Government Programs at Ansys.

== Dates of rank ==
Insignia	Rank	Component	Date	Reference
	Second Lieutenant	United States Air Force	29 May 1991	
	First Lieutenant	United States Air Force	29 May 1993	
	Captain	United States Air Force	29 May 1995	
	Major	United States Air Force	1 April 2002	
	Lieutenant Colonel	United States Air Force	1 March 2006	
	Colonel	United States Air Force	1 October 2009	
	Brigadier General	United States Air Force	2 August 2015	
