= Carl Schaefer =

Carl Schaefer may refer to:

- Carl Schaefer (artist) (1903–1995), Canadian artist
- Carl Schaefer (footballer) (1894–?), Australian footballer for St Kilda
- Carl E. Schaefer, United States Air Force lieutenant general

== See also ==
- Karl Schaefer, American television producer and writer
