= Warren D. Berry =

United States Air Force general

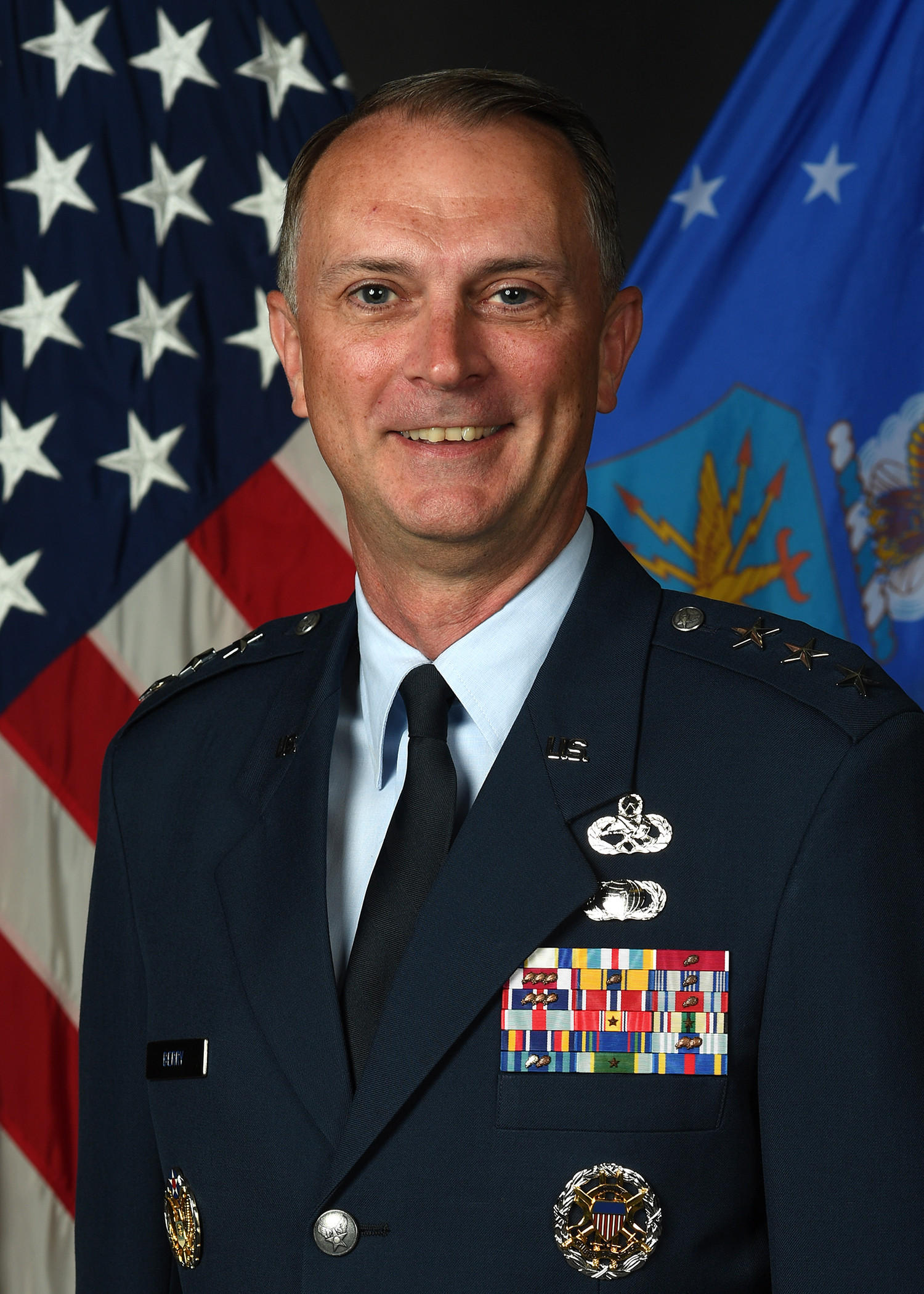
- Military career
- Allegiance: United States
- Branch: United States Air Force
- Service years: 1987–2022
- Rank: Lieutenant general
- Commands: 78th Air Base Wing; 435th Mission Support Group; 86th Maintenance Squadron; 86th Logistics Support Squadron
- Awards: Air Force Distinguished Service Medal; Defense Superior Service Medal; Legion of Merit (2)

Warren D. Berry is a retired lieutenant general in the United States Air Force who last served as the Deputy Chief of Staff for Logistics, Engineering and Force Protection.

== Effective dates of promotions ==
Rank	Date
Second lieutenant	May 16, 1987
First lieutenant	September 15, 1989
Captain	September 15, 1991
Major	August 1, 1997
Lieutenant colonel	May 1, 2000
Colonel	August 1, 2004
Brigadier general	May 2, 2011
Major general	August 2, 2014
Lieutenant general	August 17, 2018

Military offices
Preceded by Bradley Spacy	Director of Logistics, Installations, and Mission Support of the United States Air Forces in Europe – Air Forces Africa; 2011–2013	Succeeded by ???
Preceded by ???	Director of Logistics of the Air Mobility Command; 2013–2015	Succeeded by Stacey Hawkins
Preceded by H. Brent Baker Sr.	Deputy Commander of the Air Force Materiel Command; 2015–2018	Succeeded by Carl E. Schaefer
Preceded by John B. Cooper	Deputy Chief of Staff for Logistics, Engineering, and Force Protection of the United States Air Force; 2018–2022	Succeeded by Tom D. Miller
