= Donald Kirkland =

Retired U.S. Air Force Lieutenant General

Donald Eugene Kirkland II
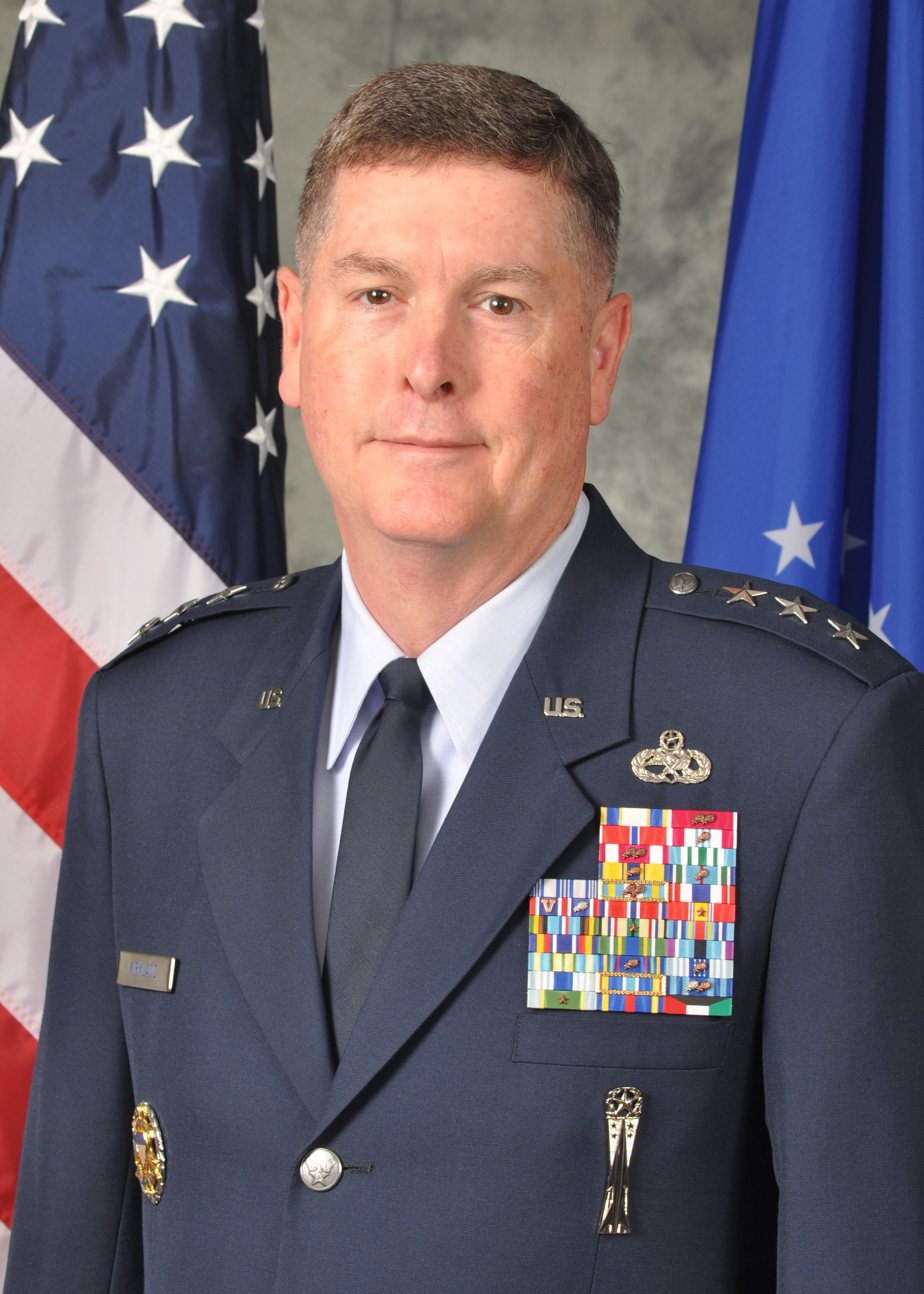
- Born: September 15, 1961; Corpus Christi, Texas, U.S.
- Died: October 5, 2023 (aged 62); Edmond, Oklahoma, U.S.
- Military career
- Allegiance: United States
- Branch: United States Air Force
- Service years: 1988–2021
- Rank: Lieutenant General
- Nickname: Gene
- Commands: Air Force Sustainment Center; Oklahoma City Air Logistics Complex; 633rd Air Base Wing; 5th Maintenance Group; 28th Munitions Squadron
- Conflicts: Gulf War
- Awards: Air Force Distinguished Service Medal; Legion of Merit (3); Bronze Star Medal

Donald Eugene Kirkland II was a retired United States Air Force lieutenant general who last served as the commander of the Air Force Sustainment Center. Previously, he was the director of logistics of the United States Air Force and executive officer to the Chief of Staff of the Air Force.

Kirkland retired in August 2021, handing command of the Air Force Sustainment Center to Tom D. Miller.

== Effective dates of promotions ==
Rank	Date
Second Lieutenant	February 23, 1988
First Lieutenant	February 23, 1990
Captain	February 23, 1992
Major	July 1, 1999
Lieutenant Colonel	March 1, 2002
Colonel	August 1, 2007
Brigadier General	May 2, 2013
Major General	March 7, 2017
Lieutenant General	August 7, 2018

Military offices
Preceded by Cedric George	Commander of the Oklahoma City Air Logistics Complex; 2012–2015	Succeeded by Mark K. Johnson
Preceded by ???	Director of Logistics, Civil Engineering, Force Protection, and Nuclear Integration of the Air Force Materiel Command; 2015–2017	Succeeded by Allan Day
Preceded by Walter Lindsley	Director of Logistics of the United States Air Force; 2017–2018	Succeeded by Cedric George
Preceded by Lee Levy	Commander of the Air Force Sustainment Center; 2018–2021	Succeeded by Tom D. Miller
