= Joseph Noble =

Joseph Noble may refer to:

- Joseph V. Noble (1920–2007), American museum administrator and antiquities collector
- Joseph William Noble (1799–1861), British politician
- Joseph D. Noble, United States Navy admiral
