= Donna D. Shipton =

U.S. Air Force general officer

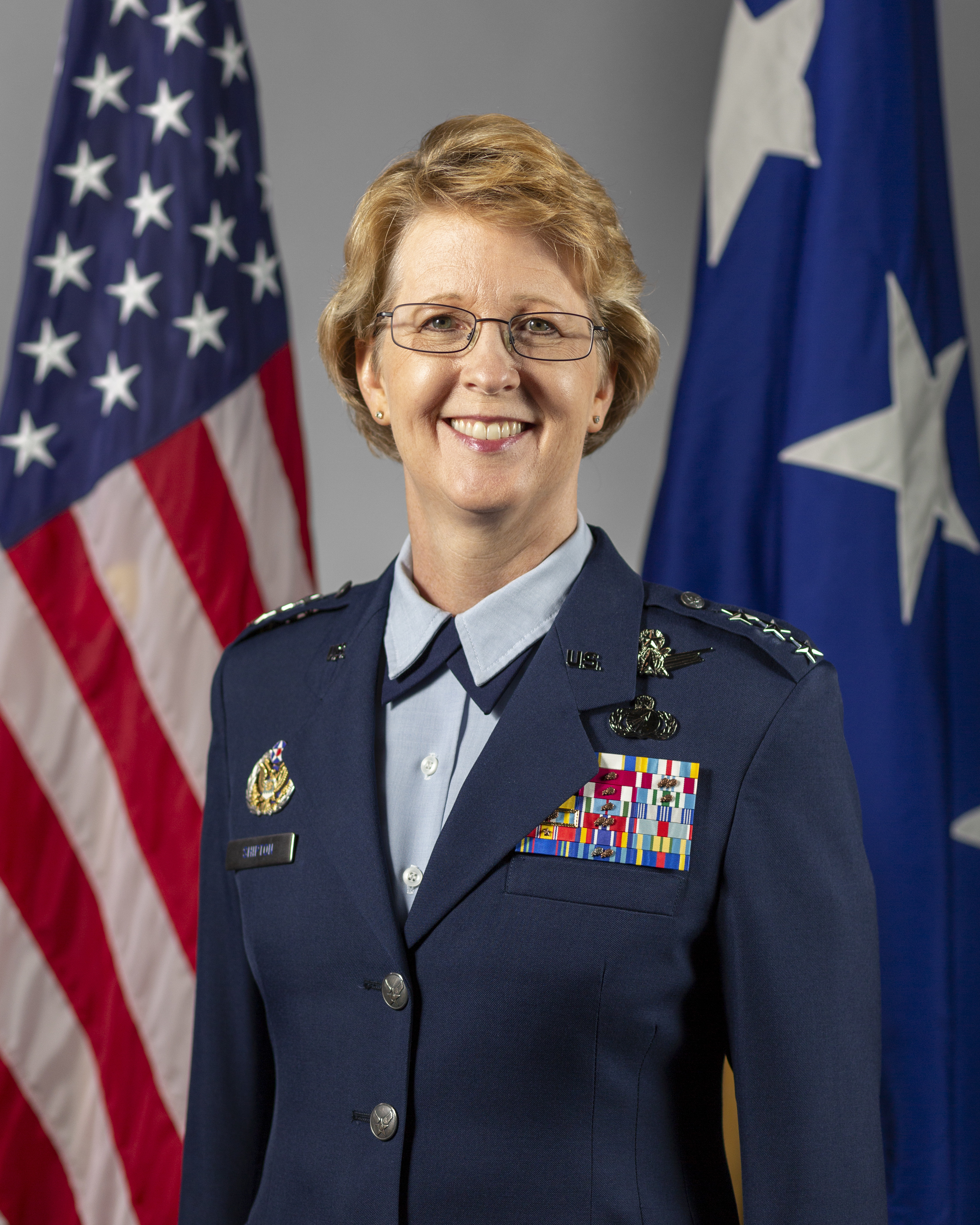
- Official portrait, 2022
- Born: c. 1970 (age 55–56); Sumter, South Carolina, U.S.
- Military career
- Allegiance: United States
- Branch: United States Air Force
- Service years: 1992–2026
- Rank: Lieutenant General
- Commands: Air Force Life Cycle Management Center; Space Force Element to the National Reconnaissance Office; Network Operations Group, NRO; Space Communications Operations Squadron, NRO
- Awards: Air Force Distinguished Service Medal; Defense Superior Service Medal; Legion of Merit (2)

Donna D. Shipton (born c. 1970) is a retired United States Air Force lieutenant general who served as commander of the Air Force Life Cycle Management Center. The Center is responsible for total life cycle management for aircraft, engines, munitions, electronic, computer, network, cyber and agile combat support systems. The center employs more than 28,000 people and has a budget of over $300 billion. Previously she served as military deputy to the Assistant Secretary of the Air Force for Acquisition, Technology and Logistics.

Shipton also served as the deputy director and commander of the Space Force Element to the National Reconnaissance Office.

== Education ==
- 1991 Bachelor of Science, electrical engineering, Clemson University, Clemson, South Carolina
- 1995 Master of Business Administration, Chapman University, Orange, California
- 1996 Undergraduate Space and Missile Training – Staff Course, Vandenberg Air Force Base, California
- 1998 Squadron Officer's School, Maxwell AFB, Alabama
- 2000 Master of Arts in organizational management, George Washington University, Washington, D.C.
- 2005 Air Command and Staff College, Maxwell AFB, Alabama
- 2005 Master of Space Systems, Air Force Institute of Technology, Wright-Patterson AFB, Ohio
- 2008 Air War College, Maxwell AFB, Alabama, by correspondence
- 2010 Master of National Security Strategy, National War College, Fort McNair, Washington, D.C.
- 2014 The Program Manager's Course, Defense Acquisition University, Fort Belvoir, Virginia
- 2017 The Executive Program Manager's Course, Defense Acquisition University, Fort Belvoir, Virginia

== Military career ==
Shipton received her commission in 1991 as a distinguished graduate of Air Force ROTC after graduating from Clemson University, majoring in electrical engineering. She also served as the Air Force program executive officer for tankers at the Air Force Life Cycle Management Center, where she was responsible for the planning and execution of all life cycle activities for the Air Force tanker fleet.

In June 2022, Shipton was nominated for promotion to lieutenant general and appointment as the military deputy to the Assistant Secretary of the Air Force for Acquisition, Technology, and Logistics. In May 2023, she was nominated for assignment as commander of the Air Force Life Cycle Management Center.

== Assignments ==
- October 1992 – June 1996, project engineer and lead systems engineer, GPS Block IIF Satellite System, GPS Joint Program Office, Los Angeles Air Force Base, California
- July 1996 – July 1998, flight commander, Operating Division-4, NRO, Onizuka Air Station, California
- August 1998 – May 2000, student, Air Force Intern Program, Headquarters Air Force, the Pentagon, Arlington, Virginia
- June 2000 – June 2002, chief of Satellite Engineering and Operations Branch, Aerospace Data Facility – Colorado, NRO, Buckley AFB, Colorado
- July 2002 – June 2003, program element monitor, Advanced Reconnaissance Programs, Airborne Reconnaissance Division, Information Dominance Directorate, Assistant Secretary of the Air Force for Acquisition, SAF/AQI, the Pentagon, Arlington, Virginia
- June 2003 – May 2004, speechwriter, Under Secretary of the Air Force (dual-hatted as director, NRO), SECAF/CSAF Executive Action Group, Headquarters Air Force, the Pentagon, Arlington, Virginia
- June 2004 – June 2005, intermediate developmental education student, Air Force Institute of Technology, Wright-Patterson AFB, Ohio
- July 2005 – June 2007, deputy program manager and program manager, Advanced Space Control Demonstrations, Counterspace Group, Space Superiority Systems Wing, Los Angeles AFB, California
- June 2007 – June 2009, commander, Space Communications Operations Squadron, Communications Directorate, NRO, Los Angeles, California
- July 2009 – June 2010, secondary developmental education student, National War College, Fort McNair, Washington, D.C.
- June 2010 – July 2012, F-35 fleet manager, Logistics and Sustainment Directorate, Joint Strike Fighter Program Office, Arlington, Virginia
- August 2012 – April 2014, commander, Network Operations Group, Mission Operations and Communications Directorates, NRO, Chantilly, Virginia
- April 2014 – June 2015, senior materiel leader, Cryptologic and Cyber Systems Division, C3I&N, Air Force Life Cycle Management Center, Joint Base San Antonio-Lackland, Texas
- June 2015 – June 2017, senior military assistant, Assistant Secretary of the Air Force for Acquisition, SAF/AQI, the Pentagon, Arlington, Virginia
- June 2017 – June 2019, Air Force program executive officer for tankers, Tanker Directorate, AFLCMC, Wright-Patterson AFB, Ohio
- June 2019 – June 2020, vice commander of Space and Missile Systems Center, Los Angeles AFB, California
- June 2020 – August 2021, director of strategic plans, programs, requirements, and analyses, Air Force Materiel Command, Wright-Patterson AFB
- August 2021–August 2022, Deputy Director and Space Force Element Commander, NRO, Chantilly, Va.
- August 2022–present, Military Deputy, Office of the Assistant Secretary of the Air Force for Acquisition, Technology, and Logistics, the Pentagon, Arlington, Va."News and Media". Nro.gov.
- December 2023–July 2026, Commander, Air Force Life Cycle Management Center, Wright-Patterson AFB, Ohio.

== Awards and decorations ==
Shipton is the recipient of the following awards:

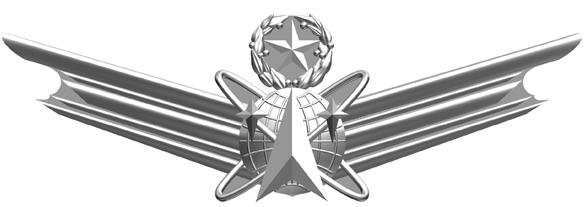

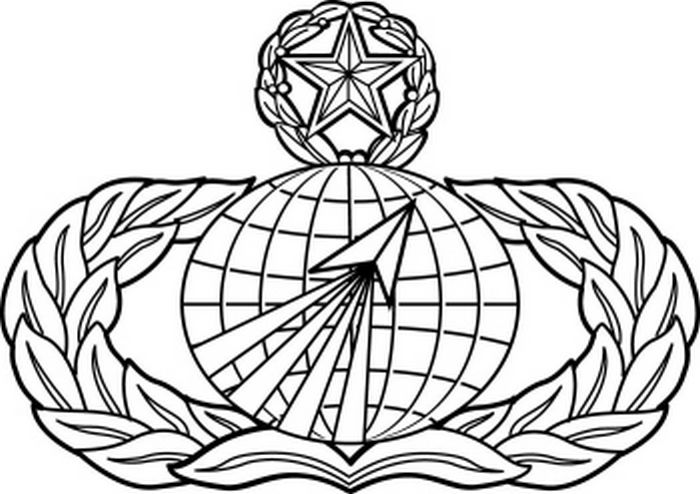

== Effective dates of promotion ==
Insignia	Rank	Date
	Lieutenant General	22 August 2022
	Major General	3 July 2020
	Brigadier General	2 August 2017
	Colonel	1 September 2011
	Lieutenant Colonel	1 December 2006
	Major	1 November 2002
	Captain	9 May 1996
	First Lieutenant	9 May 1994
	Second Lieutenant	9 May 1992

Military offices
Preceded by Duke Richardson	Director of the Tanker Directorate of the Air Force Life Cycle Management Center; 2017–2019	Succeeded by John P. Newberry
Preceded by Philip A. Garrant	Vice Commander of the Space and Missile Systems Center; 2019–2020	Succeeded by D. Jason Cothern
Preceded by Kenneth Bibb	Director of Strategic Plans, Programs, Requirements, and Analyses of the Air Force Materiel Command; 2020–2021	Succeeded by Kathryn J. Sowers
Preceded by Michael Guetlein	Deputy Director and Commander of the Space Force Element to the National Reconnaissance Office; 2021–2022	Succeeded by Christopher Povak
Preceded by Duke Richardson	Military Deputy to the Assistant Secretary of the Air Force for Acquisition, Technology and Logistics; 2022–2023	Succeeded by Dale R. White
Preceded by Dennis L. D'Angelo; Acting	Commander of the Air Force Life Cycle Management Center; 2023–present	Incumbent
