= Admiral Noble =

Admiral Noble may refer to:

- Albert G. Noble (1895–1980), U.S. Navy admiral (promoted from vice admiral upon retirement)
- Joseph D. Noble (born 1967), U.S. Navy rear admiral
- Percy Noble (Royal Navy officer) (1880–1955), British Royal Navy admiral
