= Linda Hurry =

U.S. Air Force general

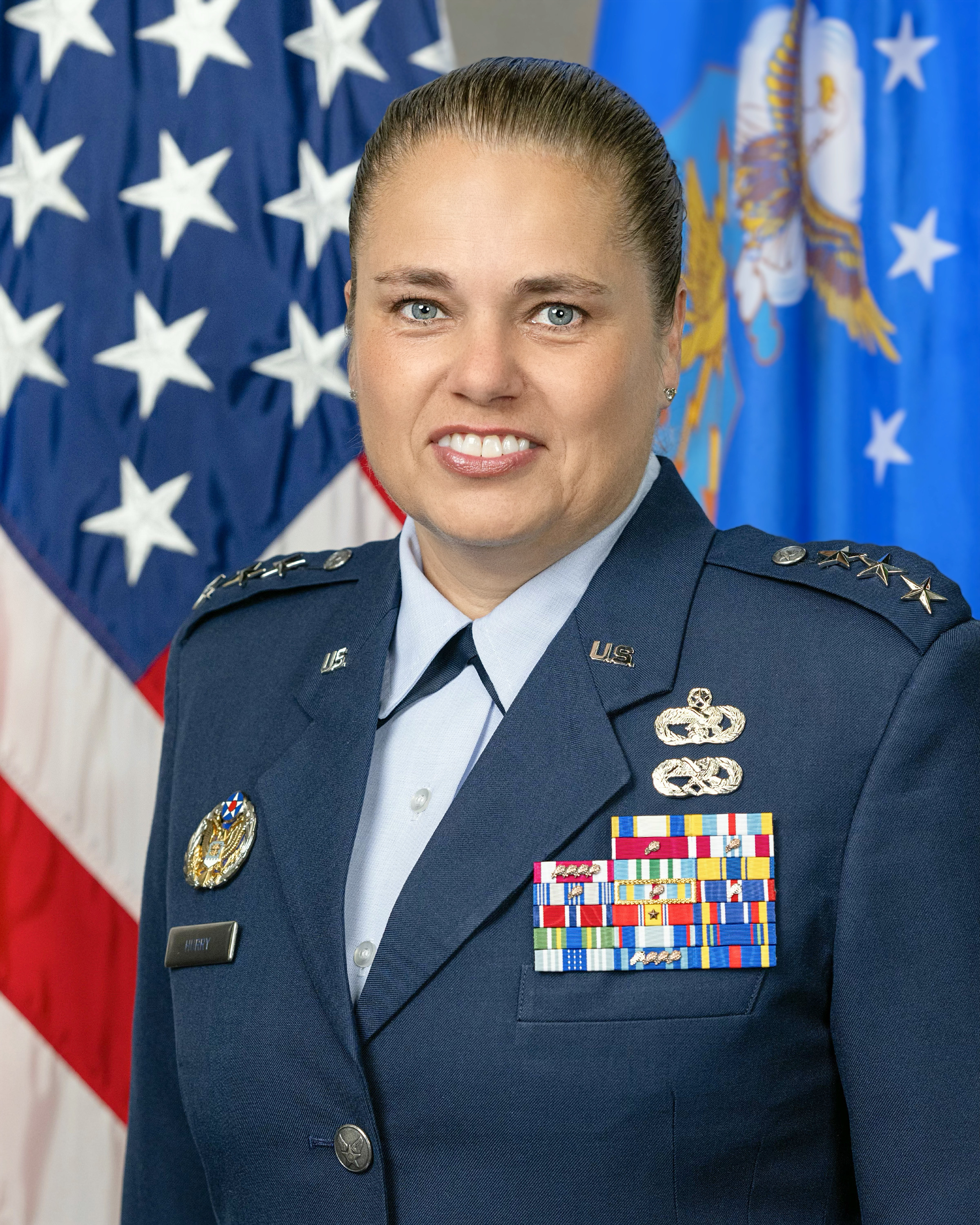
- Official portrait, 2024
- Military career
- Allegiance: United States
- Branch: United States Air Force
- Service years: 1991–present
- Rank: Lieutenant General
- Commands: Air Force Materiel Command; Defense Logistics Agency Aviation; 635th Supply Chain Operations Wing; 735th Supply Chain Operations Group; 92nd Logistics Readiness Squadron
- Awards: Defense Superior Service Medal; Legion of Merit (2)

Linda S. Hurry is a United States Air Force lieutenant general who has served as the commander of Air Force Materiel Command since January 2026. She previously served as the deputy commander of Air Force Materiel Command from January 2024 to January 2026. Before that, she served as the Director of Logistics and commander of the Defense Logistics Agency Aviation.

In May 2023, Hurry was nominated for promotion to lieutenant general.

Military offices
Preceded by Bradley D. Spacy	Director for Expeditionary Support of the Air Force Installation and Mission Support Center; 2016–2017	Succeeded by Brian R. Bruckbauer
Preceded by Allan Day	Commander of the Defense Logistics Agency Aviation; 2017–2019	Succeeded by David J. Sanford
Preceded by Cedric D. George	Director of Logistics of the United States Air Force; 2019–2024	Succeeded by Jeffrey R. King
Preceded by Carl E. Schaefer	Deputy Commander of the Air Force Materiel Command; 2024–2026	Vacant
Preceded by Duke Richardson	Commander of the Air Force Materiel Command; 2026–present	Incumbent
