= Air Force Global Logistics Support Center =

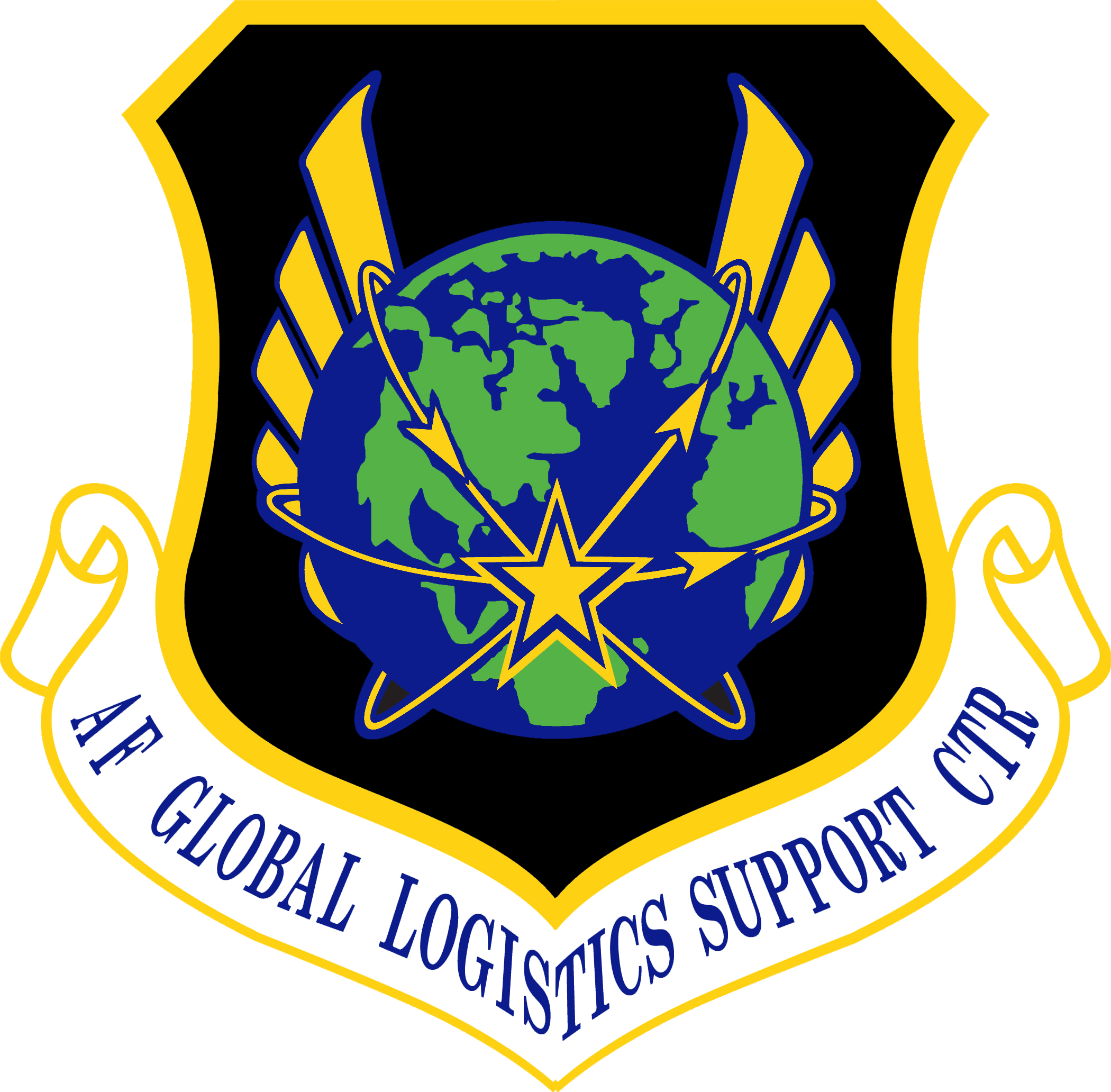
- Air Force Global Logistics Support Center Shield Part of Air Force Materiel Command
- Active: 31 March 2008 - 2012
- Country: United States
- Branch: United States Air Force
- Role: Logistics Support
- Part of: Air Force Materiel Command
- Garrison/HQ: Scott Air Force Base

Commanders
- Current commander: Major General Gary T. McCoy

The Air Force Global Logistics Support Center (AFGLSC) served as the hub for supply chain management for the U.S. Air Force. It was stood down in 2012 as part of Air Force Materiel Command restructuring.

== Organization ==
The AFGLSC consists of three subordinate units. The 448th Supply Chain Management Wing is based at Tinker Air Force Base and conducts planning and execution of logistics operations. The 635th Supply Chain Operations Wing is co-located at Scott Air Force Base and supports movement and combat operations. The 591st Supply Chain Management Group conducts strategic planning and integration from Wright-Patterson Air Force Base.
