= Allan Day =

U.S. Air Force general

Allan E. Day
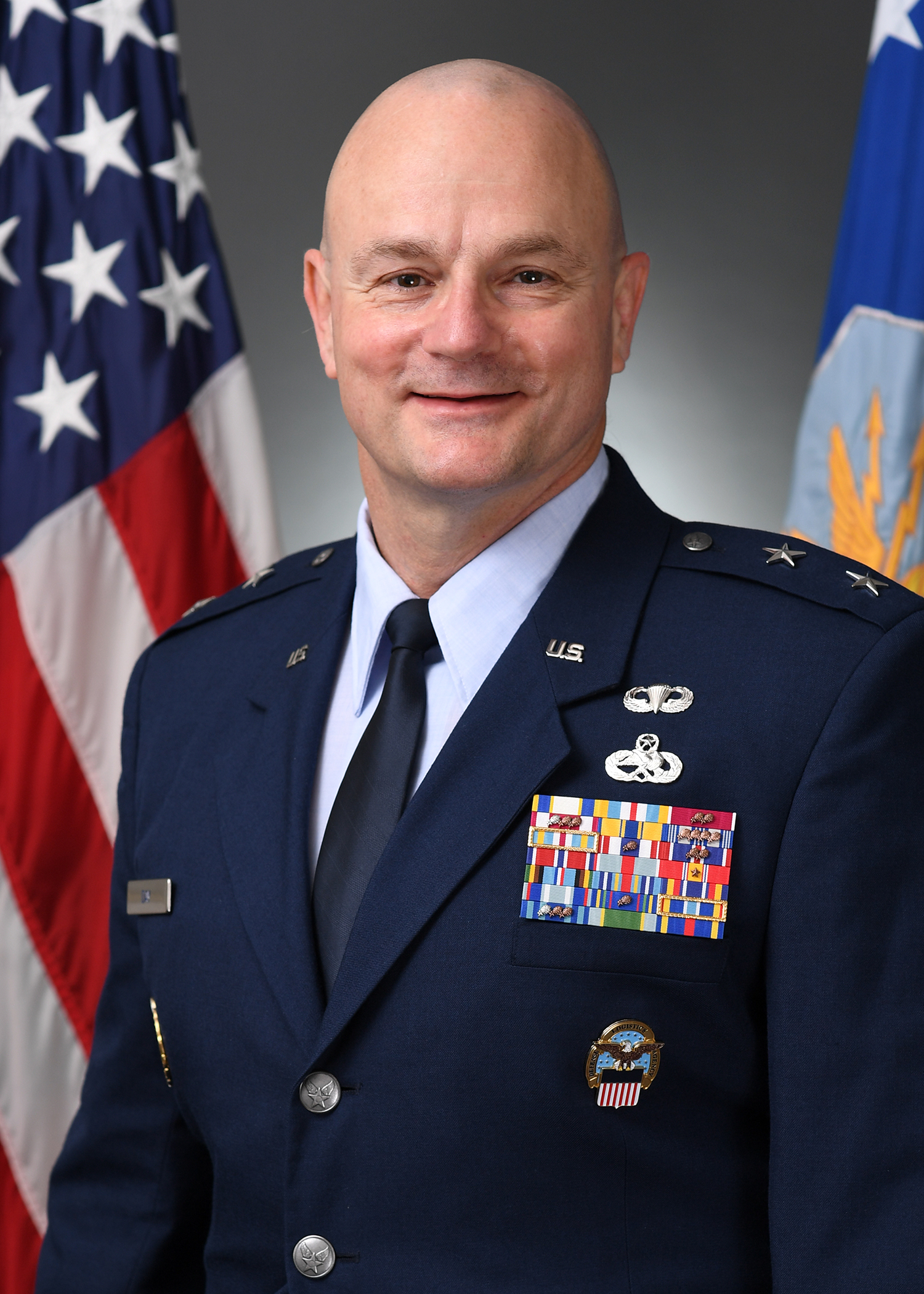
- Military career
- Allegiance: United States
- Branch: United States Air Force
- Service years: 1989–2021
- Rank: Major general
- Commands: Defense Logistics Agency Aviation; 309th Maintenance Wing; 22nd Maintenance Group; 62nd Aircraft Maintenance Squadron
- Awards: Defense Superior Service Medal; Legion of Merit (2)

Allan E. Day is a retired United States Air Force major general who recently served as the director of logistics operations of the Defense Logistics Agency. Previously, he was the director of logistics, civil engineering, force protection, and nuclear integration of the Air Force Materiel Command.

Military offices
Preceded by Mark K. Johnson	Commander of the Defense Logistics Agency Aviation; 2015–2017	Succeeded by Linda Hurry
Preceded by Donald Kirkland	Director of Logistics, Civil Engineering, Force Protection, and Nuclear Integration of the Air Force Materiel Command; 2017–2019	Succeeded by Stacey Hawkins
Preceded by Mark K. Johnson	Director of Logistics Operations of the Defense Logistics Agency; 2019–2021	Succeeded by Joseph D. Noble Jr.
