= Donald J. Hoffman =

United States Air Force general (born 1952)

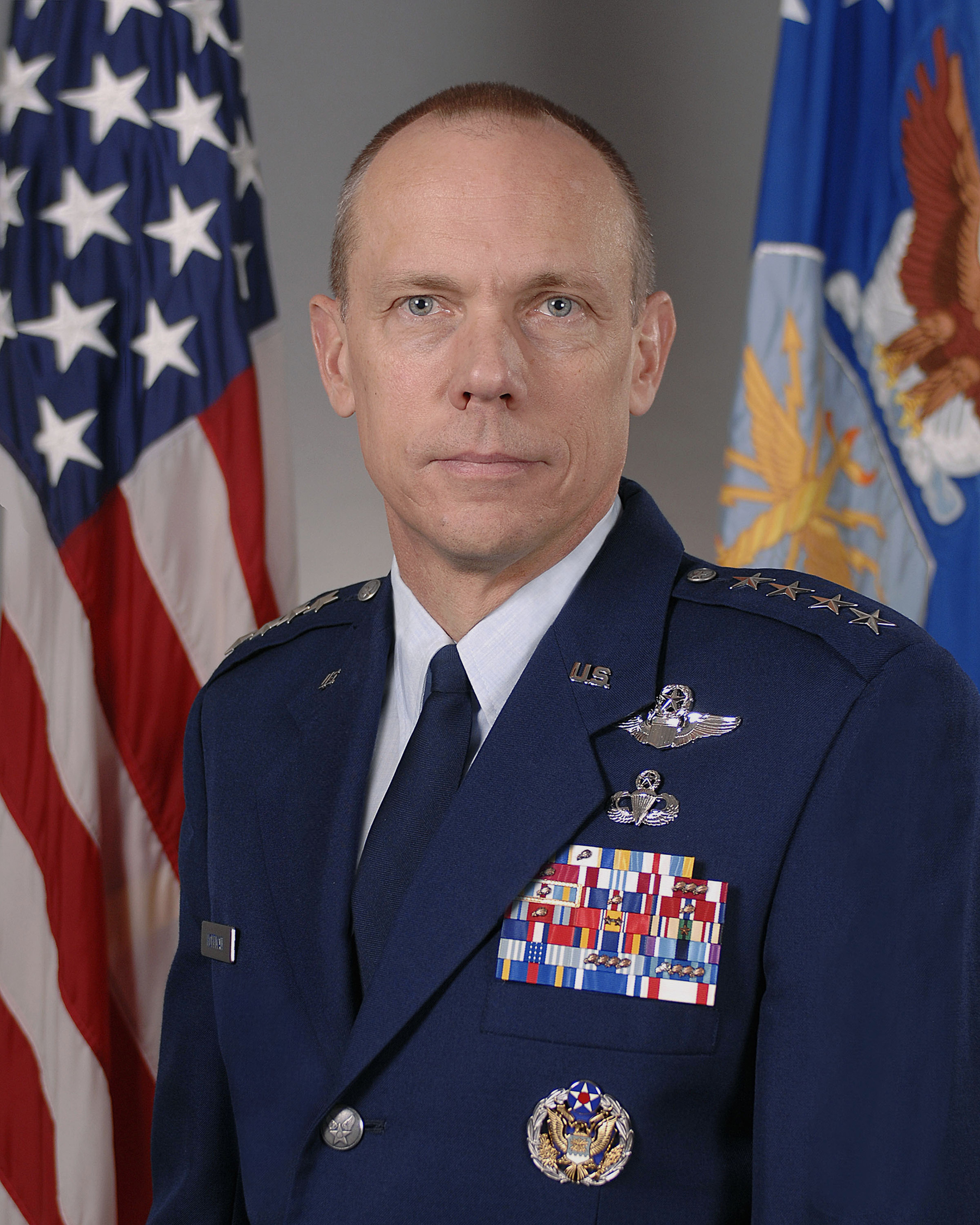
- General Donald J. Hoffman, USAF; 7th Commander, Air Force Materiel Command
- Born: April 24, 1952 (age 74)
- Military career
- Allegiance: USA
- Branch: United States Air Force
- Service years: 1974–2012
- Rank: General
- Commands: Air Force Materiel Command; 31st Fighter Wing; 31st Air Expeditionary Wing; 52nd Fighter Wing; 14th Operations Group
- Awards: Air Force Distinguished Service Medal (3); Defense Superior Service Medal; Legion of Merit (2); Defense Meritorious Service Medal; Meritorious Service Medal (4)

Donald Joseph Hoffman (born April 24, 1952) is a former United States Air Force four-star general who served as the 7th Commander, Air Force Materiel Command. He previously served as Military Deputy, Office of the Assistant Secretary of the Air Force for Acquisition from August 2005 to November 20, 2008. As Air Force Materiel Command's commander, he leads the command's 74,000 Air Force and civilian personnel, manage $59 billion annually in research, development, test and evaluation. He also oversees the acquisition management services and logistics support which is required to develop, procure and sustain Air Force weapon systems. Hoffman assumed his command on November 21, 2008. He retired from the Air Force on July 1, 2012.

A native of Wisconsin, Hoffman is a graduate of the U.S. Air Force Academy. He was commissioned in 1974 and served in various operational and staff assignments in Europe, the Middle East and United States. He has commanded at the flight, squadron, group and wing levels, and has served on the staffs of U.S. Central Command, U.S. European Command, Air Education and Training Command, Air Combat Command and Headquarters U.S. Air Force.

General Hoffman is a command pilot with more than 3,400 flying hours in fighter, trainer and transport aircraft.

== Education ==
- 1974 Distinguished graduate, Bachelor of Science degree in electrical engineering, U.S. Air Force Academy, Colorado Springs, Colo.
- 1975 Master of Science degree in electrical engineering, University of California, Berkeley.
- 1978 Distinguished graduate, Squadron Officer School, Maxwell AFB, Ala.
- 1986 Distinguished graduate, Air Command and Staff College, Maxwell AFB, Ala.
- 1992 National War College, Fort Lesley J. McNair, Washington, D.C.
- 1998 National Security Management Course, Syracuse University, Syracuse, N.Y.

== Assignments ==
- June 1974 – June 1975, graduate student, Air Force Institute of Technology, University of California, Berkeley
- June 1975 – January 1977, student, undergraduate pilot training, Williams AFB, Ariz., and pilot instructor training, Randolph AFB, Texas
- January 1977 – June 1981, T-37 instructor, check pilot and squadron executive officer, 89th Flying Training Squadron, later, life support officer, 80th Flying Training Wing, Sheppard AFB, Texas
- June 1981 – April 1982, student, F-16 upgrade training, MacDill AFB, Fla.
- April 1982 – July 1985, F-16 pilot, flight lead, instructor pilot, flight commander and assistant operations officer, 10th Tactical Fighter Squadron, Hahn Air Base, West Germany
- August 1985 – June 1986, student, Air Command and Staff College, Maxwell AFB, Ala.
- June 1986 – April 1989, air staff officer and executive officer, Directorate of Avionics and Electronic Combat, Office of the Assistant Secretary of the Air Force for Acquisition, Headquarters U.S. Air Force, Washington, D.C.
- April 1989 – June 1991, T-37 instructor and squadron commander, 98th Flying Training Squadron, Williams AFB, Ariz.
- July 1991 – June 1992, student, National War College, Fort Lesley J. McNair, Washington, D.C.
- August 1992 – July 1994, Chief, Aviation Section, Office of Military Cooperation, U.S. Central Command, Cairo, Egypt
- July 1994 – October 1995, executive officer to the Commander, Headquarters Air Education and Training Command, Randolph AFB, Texas
- October 1995 – February 1997, Commander, 14th Operations Group, Columbus AFB, Miss.
- February 1997 – December 1998, special assistant to the Supreme Allied Commander Europe, Supreme Headquarters Allied Powers Europe, Mons, Belgium
- December 1998 – March 2000, Assistant Chief of Staff for Operations, Headquarters Allied Air Forces Northwestern Europe, NATO, Royal Air Force High Wycombe, England, and Deputy Commander for NATO affairs, Headquarters 3rd Air Force, RAF Mildenhall, England
- March 2000 – May 2001, Commander, 52nd Fighter Wing, Spangdahlem AB, Germany
- May 2001 – October 2002, Commander, 31st Fighter Wing and 31st Air Expeditionary Wing, Aviano AB, Italy
- October 2002 – August 2005, Director of Requirements, Headquarters Air Combat Command, Langley AFB, Va.
- August 2005 – November 2008, Military Deputy, Office of the Assistant Secretary of the Air Force for Acquisition, the Pentagon, Washington, D.C.
- November 2008 – July 2012, Commander, Air Force Materiel Command, Wright-Patterson AFB, Ohio

== Flight information ==
- Rating: Command pilot, master parachutist
- Flight hours: More than 3,400
- Aircraft flown: F-16 Fighting Falcon, T-37 Tweet, T-38 Talon and C-12 Huron

== Awards and decorations ==
US Air Force Command Pilot Badge
Master Parachutist Badge
Headquarters Air Force Badge

Air Force Distinguished Service Medal with two bronze oak leaf clusters
Defense Superior Service Medal
Legion of Merit with oak leaf cluster
Defense Meritorious Service Medal
Meritorious Service Medal with three oak leaf clusters
Joint Meritorious Unit Award with oak leaf cluster
Air Force Outstanding Unit Award with oak leaf cluster
Air Force Organizational Excellence Award with oak leaf cluster
Combat Readiness Medal with oak leaf cluster
National Defense Service Medal with two bronze service stars
Southwest Asia Service Medal with one service star
Kosovo Campaign Medal
Global War on Terrorism Service Medal
Humanitarian Service Medal
Air Force Overseas Short Tour Service Ribbon
Air Force Overseas Long Tour Service Ribbon with four oak leaf clusters
Air Force Longevity Service Award with one silver and three bronze oak leaf clusters
Air Force Training Ribbon
Aerial Merit Cross (Spain)
NATO Medal for the former Yugoslavia

== Promotion Dates ==
- Second Lieutenant June 5, 1974
- First Lieutenant June 5, 1976
- Captain June 5, 1978
- Major August 1, 1985
- Lieutenant Colonel May 1, 1989
- Colonel January 1, 1993
- Brigadier General February 1, 2000
- Major General June 1, 2003
- Lieutenant General November 1, 2005
- General November 21, 2008
