= Arnold W. Bunch Jr. =

US Air Force general

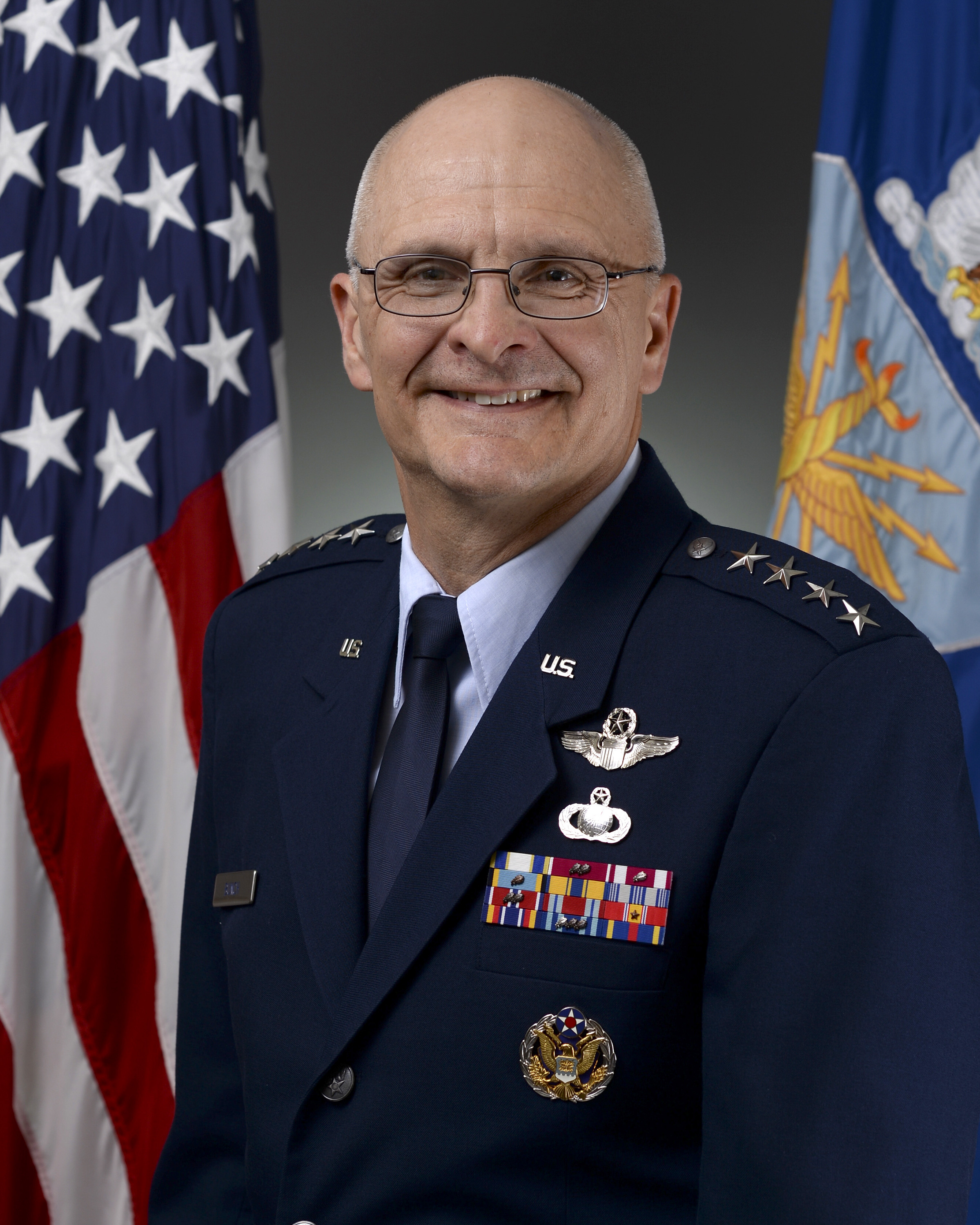
- Born: April 8, 1962 (age 64); Morristown, Tennessee, U.S.
- Military career
- Allegiance: United States
- Branch: United States Air Force
- Service years: 1984–2022
- Rank: General
- Commands: Air Force Materiel Command; Air Force Test Center; Air Force Security Assistance Center; 412th Test Wing; 419th Flight Test Squadron
- Awards: Air Force Distinguished Service Medal (3); Legion of Merit (3)

Arnold Webster Bunch Jr. (born April 8, 1962) is a retired United States Air Force four-star general. He last served as the commander of Air Force Materiel Command, headquartered at Wright-Patterson Air Force Base, Ohio. He is responsible for installation and mission support, discovery and development, test and evaluation, life cycle management services and sustainment of virtually every major Air Force weapon system. The command employs approximately 80,000 people and manages $60 billion of budget authority annually. Before his current assignment, he was the military deputy in the Office of the Assistant Secretary of the Air Force for Acquisition at The Pentagon.

After retirement from active duty on August 1, 2022, Bunch is scheduled to assume office as director of the Hamblen County school system.

== Military career ==
Born in Tennessee, Bunch was commissioned upon graduating from the United States Air Force Academy in 1984.

Upon completion of Undergraduate Pilot Training in 1985, Bunch completed operational assignments as an instructor, evaluator and aircraft commander for Boeing B-52 Stratofortress. He graduated from the United States Air Force Test Pilot School in 1991. He then conducted developmental testing in the Northrop Grumman B-2 Spirit and B-52, and served as an instructor in each. Additionally, he has commanded at the squadron, group and wing levels and was the commander of the Air Force Test Center, Edwards Air Force Base, California.

In December 2018, Bunch was nominated by President Donald Trump for promotion to general to assume command of the Air Force Materiel Command, but his nomination was later returned by the Senate without a vote in January 2019. The nomination was resubmitted in April 2019. The Armed Services Committee confirmed Bunch for a fourth star and the post of Commander of Air Force Materiel Command on May 23, and Bunch took over command eight days later.

== Education ==
- 1984 Bachelor of Science in civil engineering, U.S. Air Force Academy, Colorado Springs, Colorado
- 1991 Squadron Officer School, Maxwell Air Force Base, Alabama
- 1994 Master of Science in mechanical engineering, California State University, Fresno
- 1996 Army Command and General Staff College, Fort Leavenworth, Kansas
- 2000 Master of Science in national security strategy, National War College, Fort Lesley J. McNair, Washington, D.C.

== Assignments ==
- July 1984 – July 1985, student, Undergraduate Pilot Training, Columbus Air Force Base, Mississippi
- August 1985 – December 1985, student, B-52 Combat Crew Training School, Castle AFB, California
- January 1986 – June 1990, standardization and evaluation instructor aircraft commander of 325th Bomb Squadron, Fairchild AFB, Washington
- July 1990 – June 1991, student, U.S. Air Force Test Pilot School, Edwards AFB, California
- July 1991 – June 1992, test pilot, 6512th Test Squadron, Edwards AFB, California
- July 1992 – June 1995, test pilot, 420th Test Squadron, Edwards AFB, California
- June 1995 – June 1996, student, Army Command and General Staff College, Fort Leavenworth, Kansas
- July 1996 – July 1999, chief of B-1 Test and Evaluation, B-1 System Program Office, Wright-Patterson AFB, Ohio
- August 1999 – June 2000, student, National War College, Fort Lesley J. McNair, Washington, D.C.
- June 2000 – July 2002, commander of 419th Flight Test Squadron, Edwards AFB, California
- August 2002 – April 2003, chief of Senior Officer Management, Air Force Materiel Command, Wright-Patterson AFB, Ohio
- April 2003 – June 2004, deputy chief of Combat Forces Division, the Pentagon, Arlington, Virginia
- June 2004 – January 2006, director of Munitions Directorate, Air Force Research Laboratory, Eglin AFB, Florida
- January 2006 – May 2008, commander of 412th Test Wing, Edwards AFB, California
- June 2008 – March 2010, vice commander of Air Armament Center, Eglin AFB, Florida
- March 2010 – June 2011, director and program executive officer for the Fighters and Bombers Directorate, Aeronautical Systems Center, Wright-Patterson AFB, Ohio
- June 2011 – June 2012, commander of Air Force Security Assistance Center, AFMC, Wright-Patterson AFB, Ohio
- June 2012 – June 2015, commander of Air Force Test Center, Edwards AFB, California
- June 2015 – May 2019, military deputy, Office of the Assistant Secretary of the Air Force for Acquisition, the Pentagon, Arlington, Virginia
- May 2019 – June 2022, commander of Air Force Materiel Command, Wright-Patterson AFB, Ohio

== Flight information ==
- Rating: Command pilot
- Hours flown: More than 2,500
- Aircraft flown: B-52, B-2, KC-135, F-16, T-38 and others

== Awards and decorations ==
His major awards and decorations include:

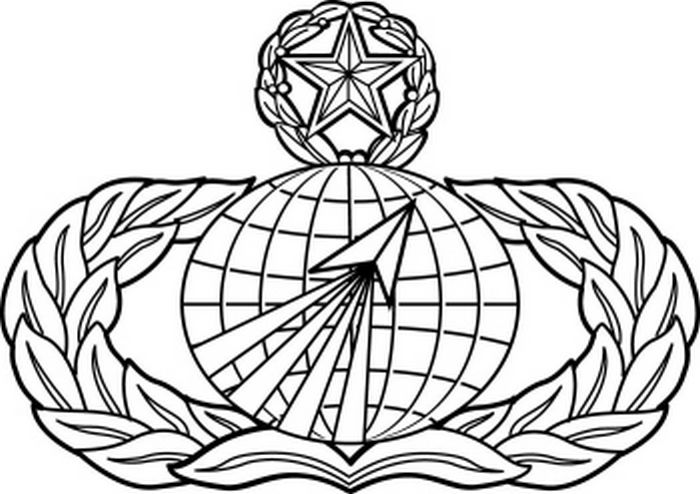
US Air Force Command Pilot Badge
Air Force Master Acquisition and Financial Management Badge
Headquarters Air Force Badge

Air Force Distinguished Service Medal with two bronze oak leaf clusters
Legion of Merit with two oak leaf clusters
Meritorious Service Medal with silver oak leaf cluster
Aerial Achievement Medal with oak leaf cluster
Air Force Commendation Medal
Air Force Achievement Medal
Air Force Organizational Excellence Award with two oak leaf clusters
Combat Readiness Medal
National Defense Service Medal with one bronze service star
Global War on Terrorism Service Medal
Air Force Longevity Service Award with one silver and three bronze oak leaf clusters
Air Force Training Ribbon

- General Arnold W. Bunch, Jr., Air Force Materiel Command Commander is presented with his personal sword during his Order of the Sword ceremony May 13, 2022 at the National Museum of the United States Air Force.

== Effective dates of promotion ==
Promotions
Insignia	Rank	Date
	General	May 31, 2019
	Lieutenant general	June 24, 2015
	Major general	Aug. 23, 2013
	Brigadier general	May 7, 2010
	Colonel	June 1, 2004
	Lieutenant colonel	Sept. 1, 1998
	Major	Dec. 1, 1995
	Captain	May 30, 1988
	First lieutenant	May 30, 1986
	Second lieutenant	May 30, 1984

Military offices
Preceded by Robert C. Nolan II	Commander of to the Air Force Test Center; 2012–2015	Succeeded by David A. Harris
Preceded by Ellen M. Pawlikowski	Military Deputy to the Assistant Secretary of the Air Force for Acquisition, Technology & Logistics; 2015–2019	Succeeded by Duke Z. Richardson
Preceded by Robert D. McMurry; Acting	Commander of the Air Force Materiel Command; 2019–2022	Succeeded by Duke Z. Richardson
