= Tom D. Miller =

U.S. Air Force Lieutenant general

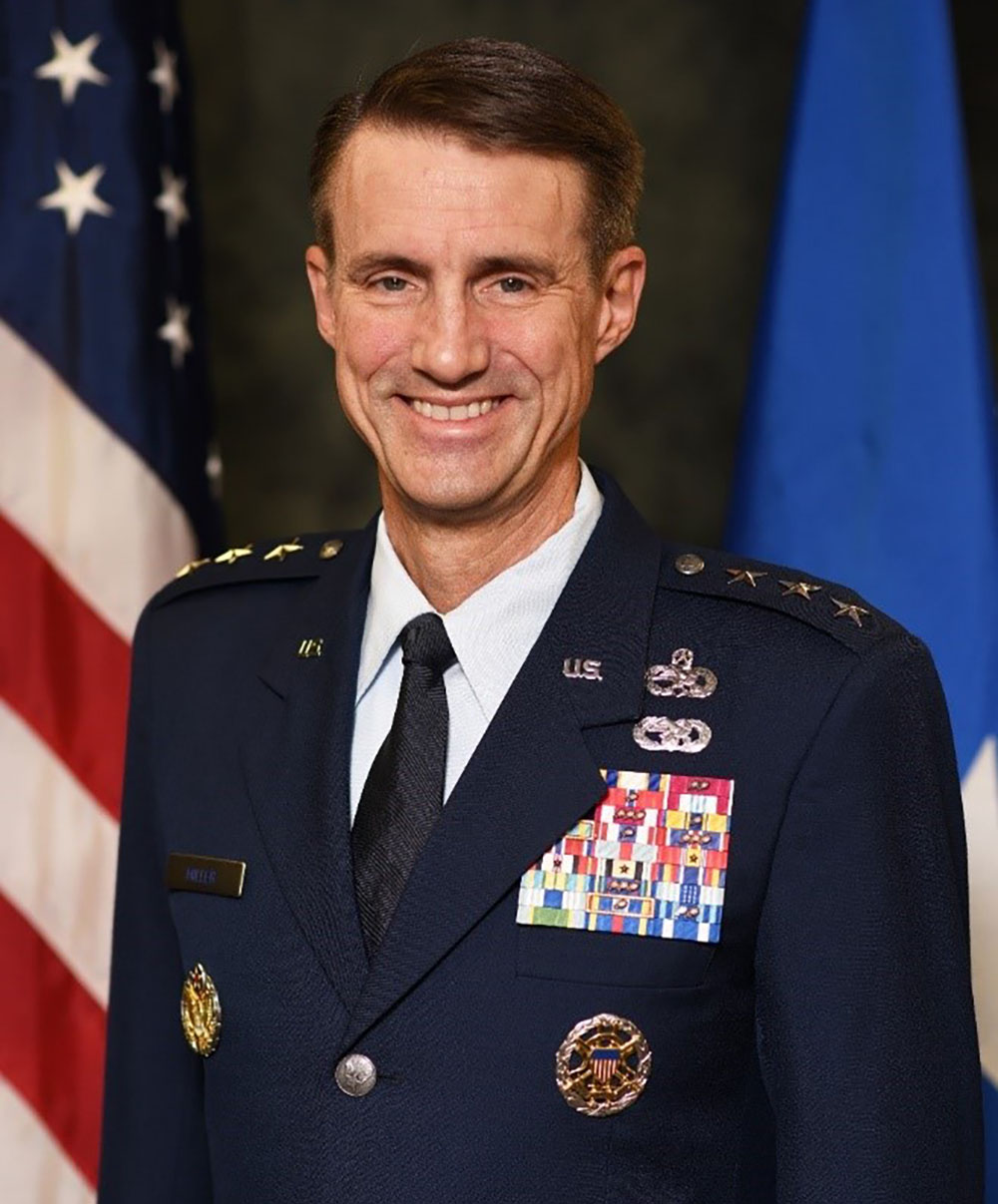
- Military career
- Allegiance: United States
- Branch: United States Air Force
- Service years: 1990–present
- Rank: Lieutenant General
- Commands: Air Force Sustainment Center; Oklahoma City Air Logistics Complex; 377th Air Base Wing; 455th Expeditionary Maintenance Group; 4th Component Maintenance Squadron
- Conflicts: Iraq War; War in Afghanistan
- Awards: Legion of Merit (3); Bronze Star Medal (2)

Tom D. Miller was a United States Air Force lieutenant general who served as the deputy chief of staff for logistics, engineering, and force protection of the U.S. Air Force. He previously commanded the Air Force Sustainment Center from 2021 to 2022.

== Military career ==
In July 2021, Miller was nominated for promotion to lieutenant general and assignment as commander of the Air Force Sustainment Center, succeeding Lieutenant General Donald Kirkland. In April 2022, Miller was nominated for appointment as deputy chief of staff for logistics, engineering, and force protection of the United States Air Force.

== Effective dates of promotions ==
Rank	Date
Second Lieutenant	1 November 1990
First Lieutenant	1 November 1992
Captain	1 November 1994
Major	1 December 2001
Lieutenant Colonel	1 March 2006
Colonel	1 October 2009
Brigadier General	3 May 2016
Major General	2 August 2019
Lieutenant General	17 August 2021

Military offices
Preceded by John C. Kubinec	Commander of the 377th Air Base Wing; 2013–2015	Succeeded by Eric H. Froehlich
Preceded by John C. Kubinec	Vice Commander of the Air Force Sustainment Center; 2015–2017	Succeeded by Eric H. Froehlich
Preceded by Mark K. Johnson	Commander of the Oklahoma City Air Logistics Complex; 2017–2018	Succeeded by Christopher D. Hill
Preceded by Carl A. Buhler	Director of Logistics, Engineering, and Force Protection of the Air Combat Command; 2018–2021	Succeeded by Stacey Hawkins
Preceded by Donald Kirkland	Commander of the Air Force Sustainment Center; 2021–2022	Succeeded by Stacey Hawkins
Preceded by Warren D. Berry	Deputy Chief of Staff for Logistics, Engineering, and Force Protection of the United States Air Force; 2022–present	Incumbent
