= Jeffrey R. King =

U.S. Air Force general

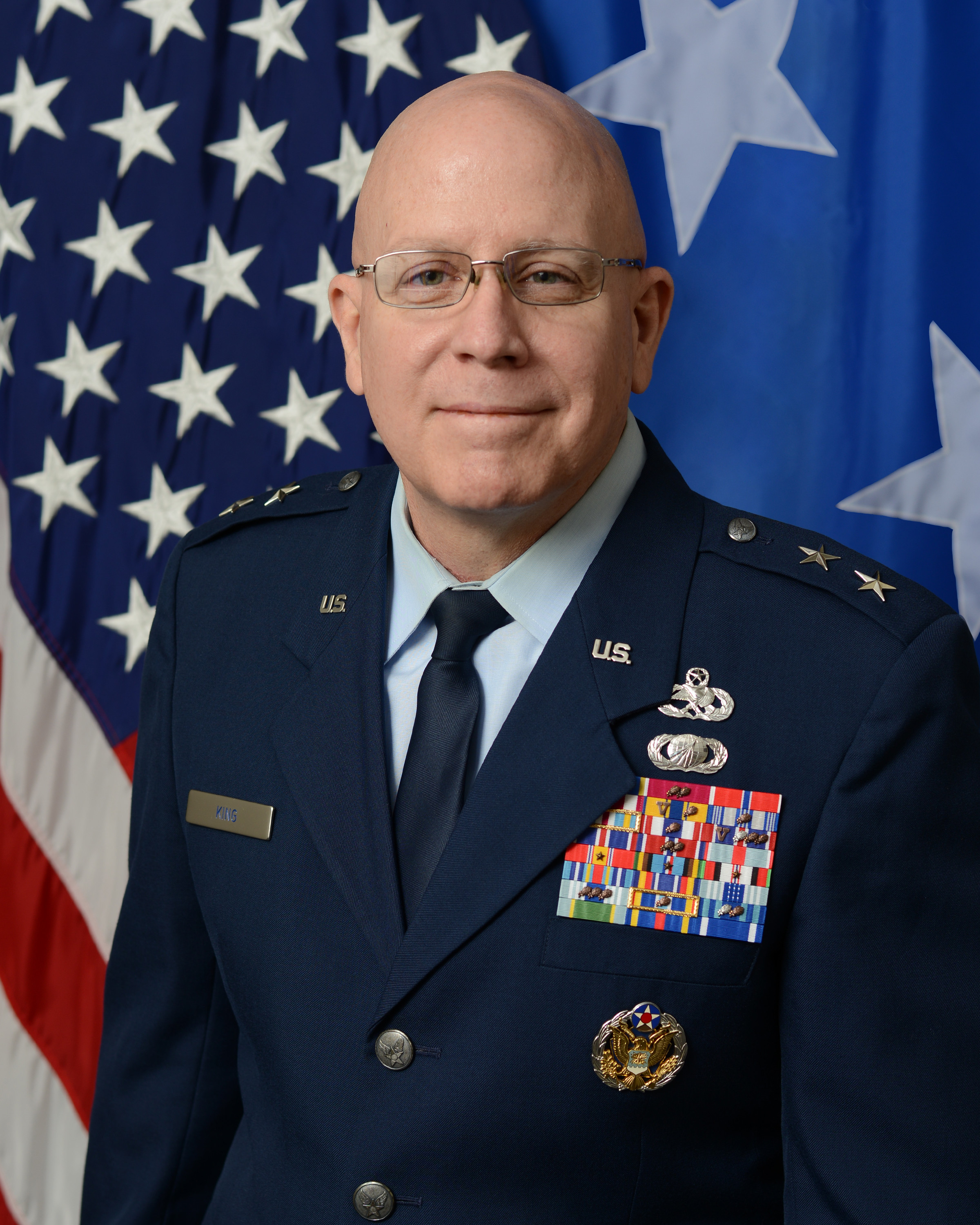
- Military career
- Allegiance: United States
- Branch: United States Air Force
- Service years: 1993–present
- Rank: Major General
- Commands: Oklahoma City Air Logistics Complex; 78th Air Base Wing; 18th Maintenance Group; 455th Expeditionary Maintenance Group; 3rd Component Maintenance Squadron
- Awards: Legion of Merit (3)

Jeffrey R. King is a United States Air Force major general, who served as the commander of the Oklahoma City Air Logistics Complex from 2020 to 2023.

== Military career ==
King entered the Air Force in 1993, after receiving his commission as a Distinguished Graduate of the Air Force ROTC program at Loyola Marymount University. In February 2021, he was nominated and confirmed for promotion to major general, and was promoted effective July 6, 2021.

Military offices
Preceded by Christopher D. Hill	Director of Logistics, Engineering and Force Protection Pacific Air Forces; 2018–2020	Succeeded by Sean K. Tyler
Preceded by Christopher D. Hill	Commander of the Oklahoma City Air Logistics Complex; 2020–2023	Succeeded by Brian R. Moore
Preceded by Linda Hurry	Director of Logistics of the United States Air Force; 2024–present	Incumbent
