= Carl E. Schaefer =

Air Force Materiel deputy commander

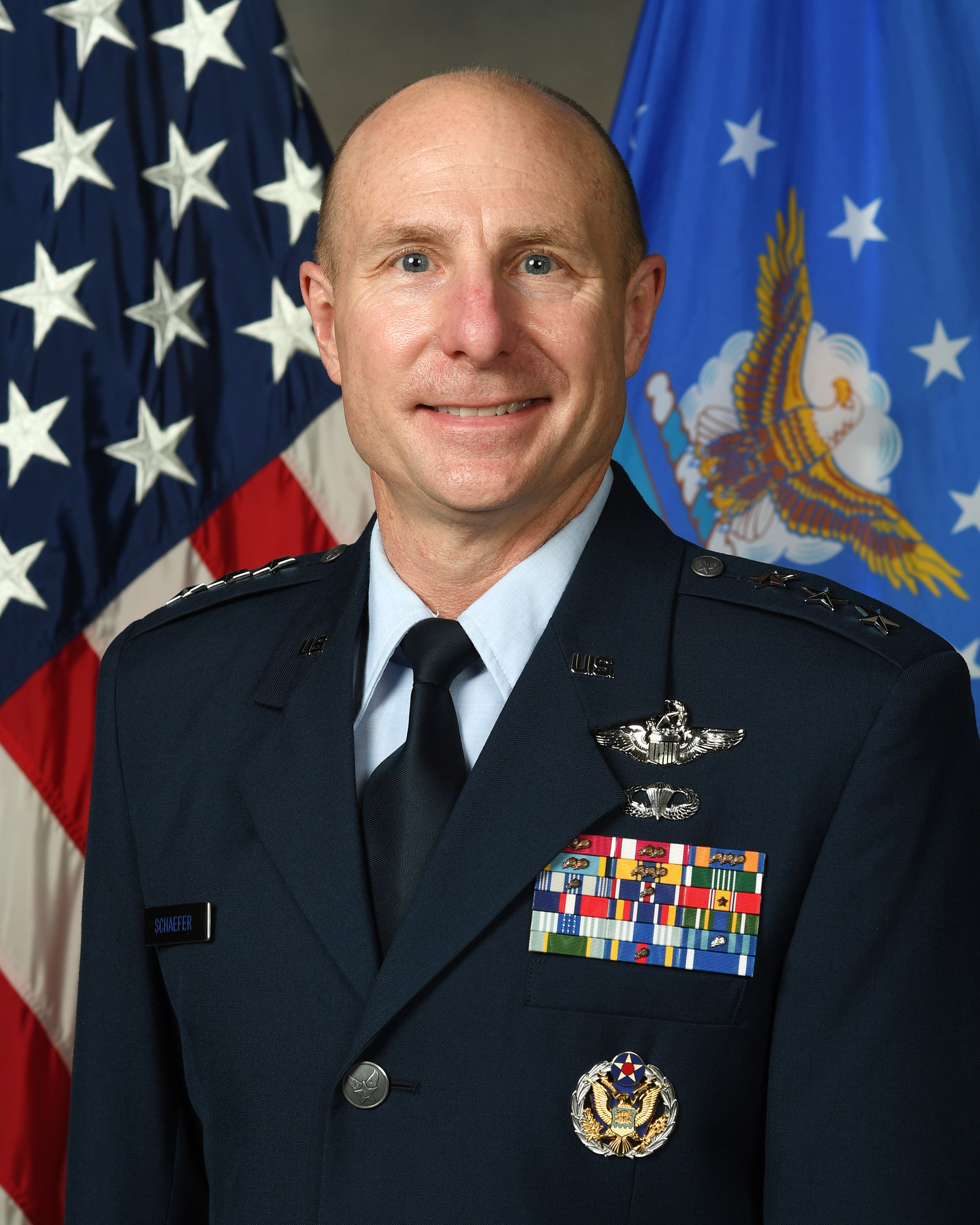
- Military career
- Allegiance: United States
- Branch: United States Air Force
- Service years: 1990–2023
- Rank: Lieutenant General
- Commands: 412th Test Wing; 46th Operations Group; 445th Flight Test Squadron
- Awards: Air Force Distinguished Service Medal; Legion of Merit (3)

Carl E. Schaefer is a retired United States Air Force lieutenant general who last served as the deputy commander of the Air Force Materiel Command. Prior to that, he commanded the 412th Test Wing.

== Awards and decorations ==
US Air Force Command Pilot Badge
Basic Parachutist Badge
Headquarters Air Force Badge

Air Force Distinguished Service Medal
Legion of Merit with two bronze oak leaf clusters
Meritorious Service Medal with two oak leaf clusters
Air Medal with three oak leaf clusters
Aerial Achievement Medal with two oak leaf clusters
Air Force Commendation Medal with three oak leaf clusters
Army Commendation Medal
Air Force Achievement Medal with oak leaf cluster
Air Force Outstanding Unit Award with oak leaf cluster
National Defense Service Medal with one bronze service star
Kosovo Campaign Medal
Global War on Terrorism Service Medal
Korea Defense Service Medal
Air Force Overseas Short Tour Service Ribbon
Air Force Overseas Long Tour Service Ribbon
Air Force Longevity Service Award with one silver and one bronze oak leaf clusters
Small Arms Expert Marksmanship Ribbon
Air Force Training Ribbon with oak leaf cluster
NATO Medal for service in the former Yugoslavia

== Effective dates of promotions ==
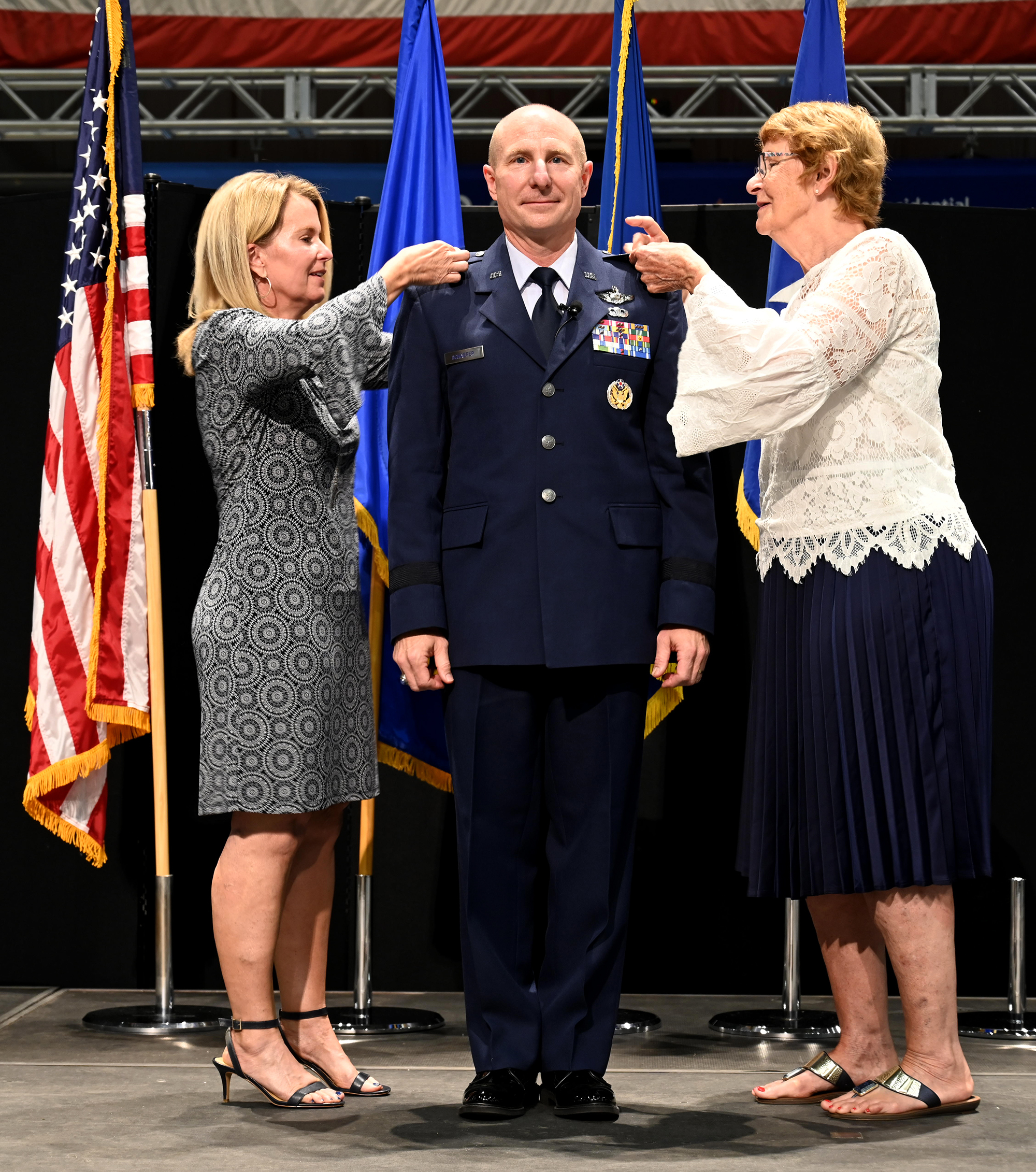
Schaefer stands and smiles while his family pins the rank of lieutenant general on his uniform Aug. 7 at the National Museum of the United States Air Force, Wright-Patterson Air Force Base, Ohio.

Rank	Date
Second Lieutenant	May 30, 1990
First Lieutenant	May 30, 1992
Captain	May 30, 1994
Major	June 1, 2001
Lieutenant Colonel	June 1, 2006
Colonel	October 1, 2010
Brigadier General	October 1, 2015
Major General	October 19, 2018
Lieutenant General	July 21, 2020

Military offices
Preceded by ???	Commander of the 412th Test Wing; 2015–2018	Succeeded by E. John Teichert
Preceded by Warren D. Berry	Deputy Commander of the Air Force Materiel Command; 2020–2023	Succeeded by Linda S. Hurry
