= Duke Richardson =

U.S. Air Force general

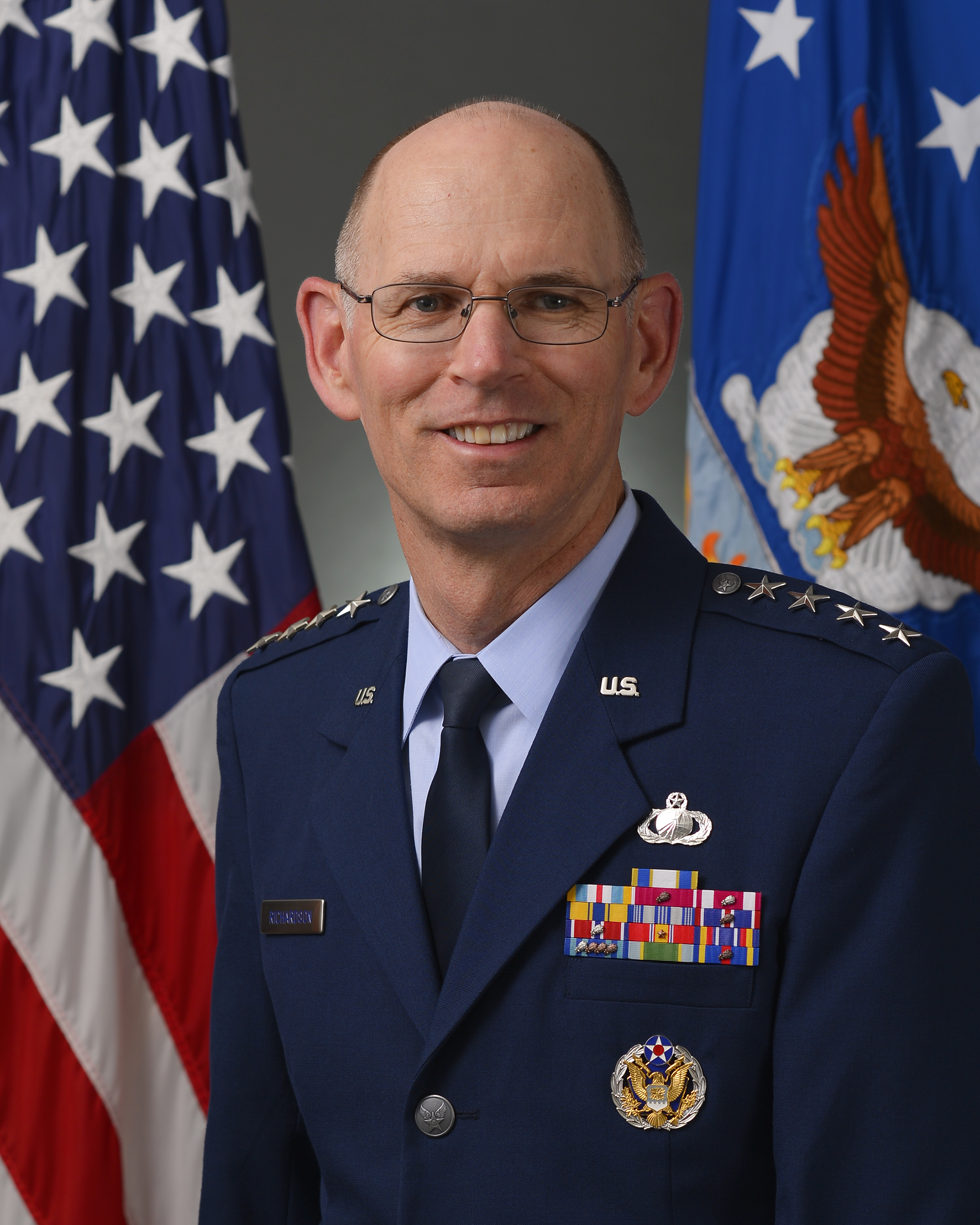
- Official portrait, 2022
- Born: c. 1964 (age 61–62)
- Military career
- Allegiance: United States
- Branch: United States Air Force
- Service years: 1983–2025
- Rank: General
- Commands: Air Force Materiel Command; Presidential and Executive Airlift Directorate, AFLCMC; Presidential Airlift Recapitalization Directorate, AFLCMC; Tanker Directorate, AFLCMC; 823rd Aeronautical Systems Group
- Awards: Air Force Distinguished Service Medal; Defense Superior Service Medal; Legion of Merit (2)

Duke Zane Richardson (born c. 1964) is a retired United States Air Force general who last served as the commander of Air Force Materiel Command from 2022 to 2025. He served as the military deputy to the Assistant Secretary of the Air Force for Acquisition, Technology and Logistics, and before that was the director of the Presidential & Executive Airlift Directorate at the Air Force Life Cycle Management Center.

Richardson attended Marana High School in Marana, Arizona, graduating in 1982. He enlisted in the Air Force in 1983.

== Awards and decorations ==
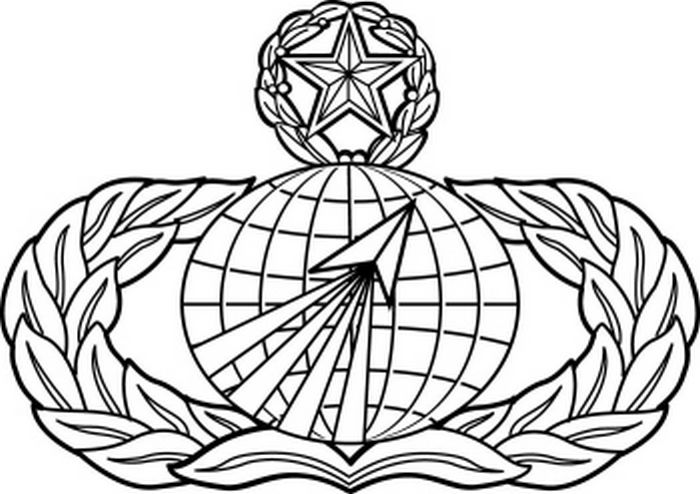
Air Force Master Acquisition and Financial Management Badge
Headquarters Air Force Badge

Air Force Distinguished Service Medal
Defense Superior Service Medal
Legion of Merit with one bronze oak leaf cluster
Meritorious Service Medal with silver oak leaf cluster
Air Force Commendation Medal
Air Force Achievement Medal
Air Force Outstanding Unit Award with oak leaf cluster
Air Force Organizational Excellence Award with silver oak leaf cluster
National Defense Service Medal with one bronze service star
Global War on Terrorism Service Medal
Air Force Longevity Service Award with one silver and three bronze oak leaf clusters
Small Arms Expert Marksmanship Ribbon
Air Force Training Ribbon with oak leaf cluster

== Effective dates of promotions ==
Rank	Date
Second Lieutenant	28 September 1989
First Lieutenant	28 September 1991
Captain	28 September 1993
Major	1 July 1999
Lieutenant Colonel	1 March 2003
Colonel	1January 2007
Brigadier General	2 August 2013
Major General	3 July 2017
Lieutenant General	20 June 2019
General	13 June 2022

Military offices
Preceded by John F. Thompson	Director of the Tanker Directorate of the Air Force Life Cycle Management Center; 2014–2017	Succeeded by Donna D. Shipton
New office	Director of the Presidential & Executive Airlift Directorate of the Air Force Life Cycle Management Center; 2017–2019	Succeeded by Ryan Britton
Preceded by Arnold W. Bunch Jr.	Military Deputy to the Assistant Secretary of the Air Force for Acquisition, Technology and Logistics; 2019–2022	Succeeded by Donna D. Shipton
Preceded by Arnold W. Bunch Jr.	Commander of the Air Force Materiel Command; 2022–2025	Succeeded by Linda Hurry; Acting
