= Henry Viccellio Jr. =

United States Air Force general (1940–2026)

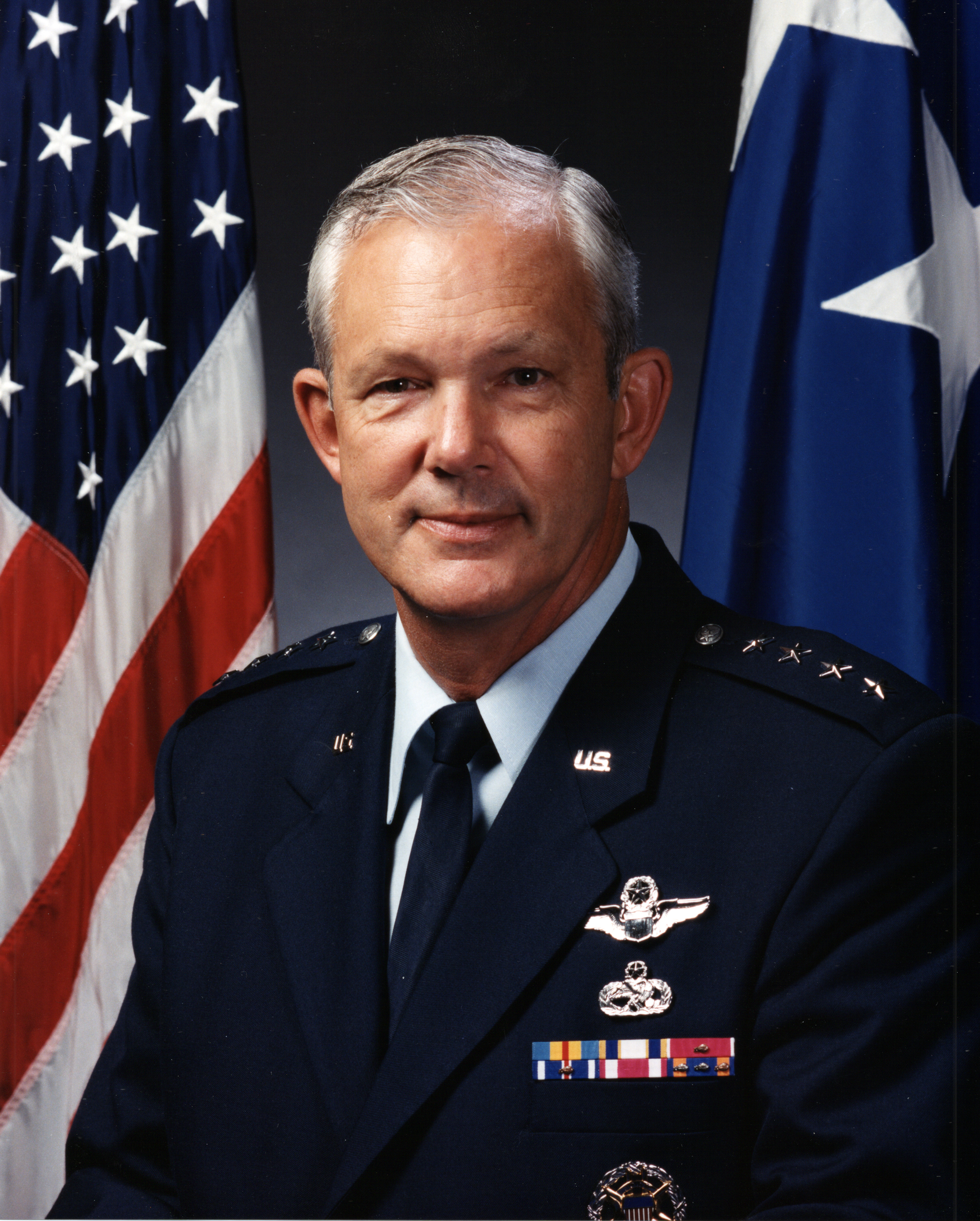
- Born: August 4, 1940; San Francisco, California, U.S.
- Died: February 5, 2026 (aged 85)
- Military career
- Allegiance: United States of America
- Branch: United States Air Force
- Service years: 1962–1997
- Rank: General
- Commands: 58th Tactical Fighter Squadron; 1st Tactical Fighter Wing; Air Education and Training Command; Air Force Materiel Command
- Conflicts: Cold War; Vietnam War

Henry Viccellio Jr. (August 4, 1940 – February 5, 2026) was a General in the United States Air Force who served as the commander of the Air Force Materiel Command.

== Life and career ==
=== Early life and education ===
Henry Viccellio Jr. was born on August 4, 1940. After graduating from the United States Air Force Academy in 1962, he attended pilot training until September of the next year at Webb Air Force Base, Texas. From October 1963 until June the next year, he attended F-100 Super Sabre combat crew training at Luke Air Force Base in Arizona. From June 1964 until October 1965, he flew the F-100 with the 309th Tactical Fighter Squadron at Homestead Air Force Base, Florida. Beginning in October and ranging for the next year, he was an A-1E Skyraider pilot for the 602nd Fighter Squadron, Udorn Royal Thai Air Force Base, Thailand. Then took the next two years off and became an Olmsted Scholar at the National Autonomous University of Mexico, Mexico City. Beginning in October 1968, he was a student, Master of Arts degree in Latin American studies at American University in Washington D.C. He graduated in June 1969.

From June 1969 until August 1970, he was part of the Air Staff Training program, staff officer, directorate of concepts and doctrine at United States Air Force headquarters, Washington D.C. He was then a F-4D Phantom II maintenance officer for the 7th Tactical Fighter Squadron at Holloman Air Force Base, New Mexico until November 1971. A transfer to the 36th Tactical Fighter Squadron at Osan Air Base, South Korea came with a job change until January 1973 as an F-4D flight commander. For the next six months, he became a student at the Armed Forces Staff College in Norfolk, Virginia. He then became a liaison officer to the United States Senate until October 1975. From November 1975 to April 1976. he was the chief, standardization and evaluation division, 33rd Tactical Fighter Wing, Eglin Air Force Base, Florida. Then, until November of that year he was operations officer of the 59th Tactical Fighter Squadron at Eglin. From December until May the next year, he became the commander of the squadron. He then took a promotion that went until November of that year as the assistant deputy commander for operations for the 33rd.

=== Later career ===
From November 1977 until March 1981, he was chief, rated officer career management branch, Air Force Manpower and Personnel Center at Randolph Air Force Base, Texas. He then became vice commander of the 507th Tactical Air Control Wing, Shaw Air Force Base, South Carolina for the next six months. From October 1981 to March 1983, he was the vice commander, and later, commander, of the 56th Tactical Training Wing at MacDill Air Force Base, Florida. He then became commander of the 1st Tactical Fighter Wing at Langley Air Force Base in Virginia from March 1983 to June 1985. He then was the vice commander of the San Antonio Air Logistics Center at Kelly Air Force Base, Texas from June 1985 to September of the following year. He then became deputy chief of staff for logistics at Tactical Air Command headquarters, Langley Air Force Base, Virginia until April 1989.

From May 1989 to September 1989, he was the vice commander of the Tactical Air Command. Until February 1991 he was the deputy chief of staff for logistics and engineering, United States Air Force headquarters, Washington D.C. For the next three months, he was the deputy chief of staff for logistics for the Air Force. He then became the director, the Joint Staff in Washington until December 1992. He was then the commander of the Air Education and Training Command, Randolph Air Force Base, Texas until June 1995. He then became the commander of Air Force Materiel Command, Wright-Patterson Air Force Base, Ohio until his retirement on June 1, 1997.

=== Personal life and death ===
Viccellio was the son of Lieutenant General Henry Viccellio Sr. (1911–1978), enlisted USAAC 1934, commissioned 1937, USAAF commander in the South Pacific during World War II, commander of the Continental Air Command, retired from the USAF in 1968, while his son is actor Benjamin Viccellio.

Henry Viccellio Jr. died on February 5, 2026, at the age of 85.

== Awards ==
Awards earned during his career:

- Defense Distinguished Service Medal
- Air Force Distinguished Service Medal
- Legion of Merit with an oak leaf cluster
- Distinguished Flying Cross with an oak leaf cluster
- Meritorious Service Medal with an oak leaf cluster
- Air Medal with eleven oak leaf clusters
- Republic of Vietnam Gallantry Cross with a palm
- Command pilot with more than 3,000 flying hours

== Dates of Promotion ==
Dates at which he was promoted:

- Second Lieutenant: June 6, 1962
- First Lieutenant: December 6, 1963
- Captain: December 6, 1966
- Major: March 1, 1971
- Lieutenant Colonel: May 1, 1975
- Colonel: May 1, 1978
- Brigadier General: October 1, 1984
- Major General: August 1, 1987
- Lieutenant General: May 1, 1989
- General: December 1, 1992
