= Carl Schaefer (footballer) =

Australian rules footballer

Personal information
- Full name: Carl Norman Ethelbert Schaefer
- Born: 16 February 1894; St Kilda, Victoria
- Died: 17 December 1936 (aged 42); Caulfield North, Victoria
- Original team: Oakleigh

Playing career^{1}
Years	Club	Games (Goals)
1920	St Kilda	1 (0)
- ^{1} Playing statistics correct to the end of 1920.

Carl Norman Ethelbert Schaefer (16 February 1894 – 17 December 1936) was an Australian rules footballer who played with St Kilda in the Victorian Football League (VFL).

He was born and played football as Carl Schaefer but later in his life chose to be known as Clive Howard, possibly due anti-German sentiment following World War I. He died in December 1936.
