= 635th Supply Chain Operations Wing =

635th Supply Chain Operations Wing
- Active: 1966-1976; 2008-present
- Country: United States
- Branch: Air Force
- Type: Logistics Operations
- Part of: Air Force Sustainment Center
- Garrison/HQ: Scott Air Force Base
- Nickname: Tigers
- Motto: "One call"
- Mascot: Tigers
- Anniversaries: 9 Apr
- Decorations: Air Force Outstanding Unit Award w/Combat "V" Device Vietnamese Gallantry Cross with Palm

Commanders
- Current commander: Col Jason M. Kalin
- Notable commanders: Col Mark K. Johnson

Insignia
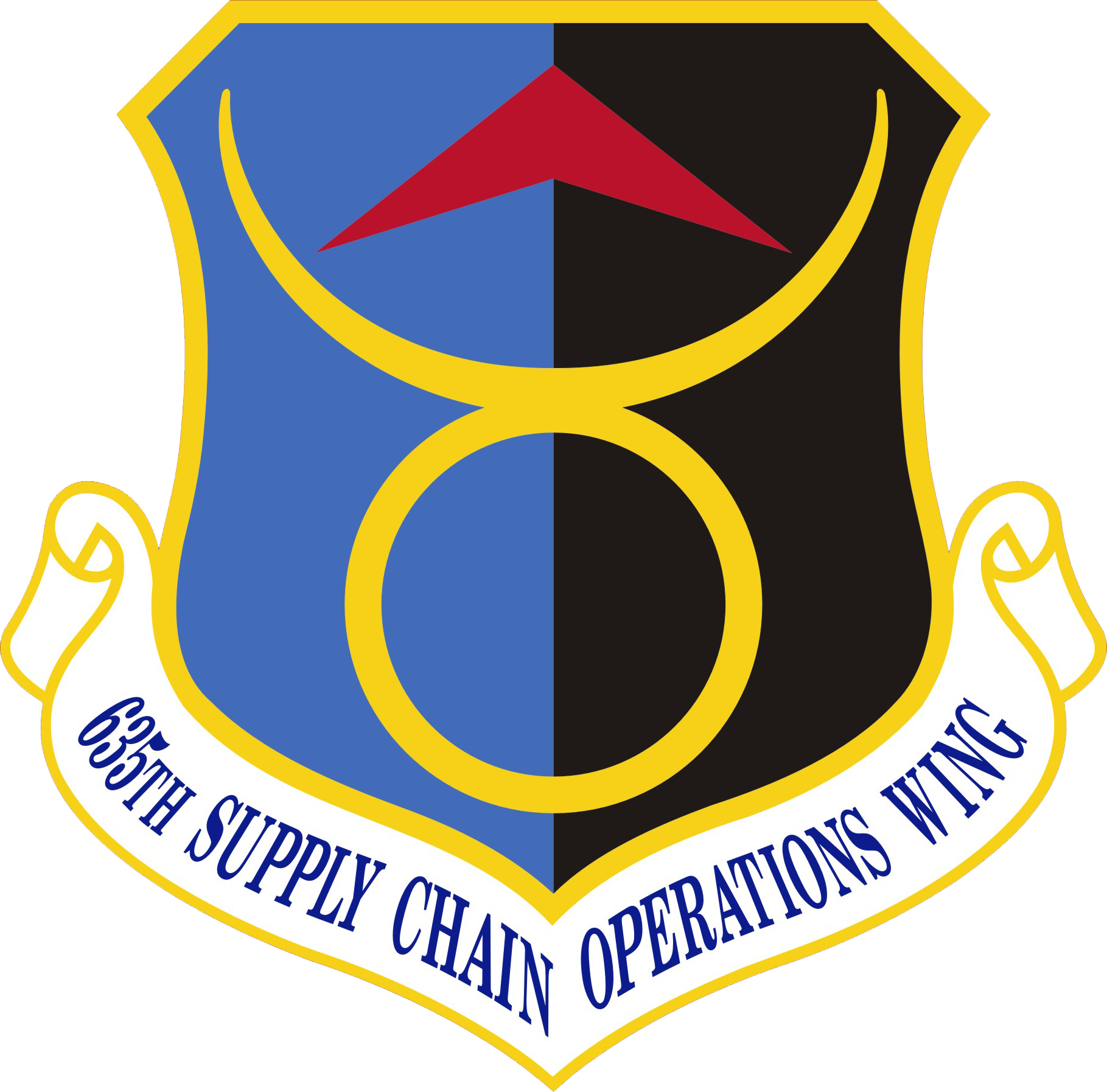
- 635th Supply Chain Operations Wing emblem (approved 7 March 1968)

The 635th Supply Chain Operations Wing, United States Air Force, is a logistics wing. It reports to the Air Force Sustainment Center, part of Air Force Materiel Command, and serves as the Air Force's new supply chain manager headquartered at Scott Air Force Base, Illinois. It is an associate tenant at the base.

== History ==
The wing was originally activated at U-Tapao Royal Thai Navy Airfield in June 1966 as the Pacific Air Forces support organization for operations from the base, primarily the Strategic Air Command Young Tiger Task Force.

Activated as the headquarters for the Mobility Air Forces Logistics Support Center (redesignated 635th Supply Chain Management Group) and the Combat Air Forces Logistics Support Center (redesignated 735th Supply Chain Management Group) in 2008.

Its units now include the:

- 635th Supply Chain Operations Group, Scott Air Force Base, Illinois
- 735th Supply Chain Operations Group, Langley Air Force Base, Virginia
- 635th Materiel Maintenance Group, Holloman Air Force Base, New Mexico
- Detachment 1, Air Force Petroleum Office, Ft. Belvoir, Virginia

== Lineage ==
- Constituted as the 635th Combat Support Group on 17 May 1966 and activated (not organized)

Organized on 8 July 1966
Redesignated 635th Aerospace Support Group on 30 January 1976
Inactivated on 20 June 1976

- Redesignated 635th Supply Chain Management Wing on 12 March 2008

Activated on 1 April 2008
Redesignated 635th Supply Chain Operations Wing on 30 June 2010

=== Assignments ===
- Pacific Air Forces, 17 May 1966 (not organized)
- Thirteenth Air Force, 8 July 1966
- 17th Air Division, 1 July 1975
- Thirteenth Air Force, 1 January 1976 – 20 June 1976
- Air Force Global Logistics Support Center, 1 April 2008 (attached to Air Force Sustainment Center after 11 July 2012)
- Air Force Sustainment Center, 1 October 2012 – present

=== Stations ===
- U Tapao Royal Thai Navy Airfield, Thailand 8 July 1966 – 20 June 1976
- Scott Air Force Base, Illinois, 1 April 2008 – present

=== Components ===
==== Groups ====
- 635th Supply Chain Management Group (later 635th Supply Chain Operations Group), 1 April 2008 -
- 735th Supply Chain Management Group (later 735th Supply Chain Operations Group), 1 April 2008 -

==== Squadrons ====
- 635th Air Police Squadron (later 635th Security Police Squadron), 8 July 1966 – 20 June 1976
- 635th Civil Engineering Squadron, 8 July 1966 – 20 June 1976
- 635th Munitions Maintenance Squadron, 15 May 1967 – 20 June 1976
- 635th Services Squadron, 8 July 1966 – 28 February 1975
- 635th Supply Squadron, 8 July 1966 – 20 June 1976

==== Other ====
- 11th USAF Dispensary (later 11th USAF Hospital), 8 July 1966 – 20 June 1976

=== Awards and campaigns ===
Award streamer	Award	Dates	Notes
	Air Force Outstanding Unit Award w/Combat "V" Device	8 July 1966-30 June 1968	635th Combat Support Group
	Air Force Outstanding Unit Award w/Combat "V" Device	1 January 1970-30 May 1971	635th Combat Support Group
	Air Force Outstanding Unit Award w/Combat "V" Device	1 June 1971-31 May 1972	635th Combat Support Group
	Air Force Outstanding Unit Award w/Combat "V" Device	1 June 1972-31 March 1973	635th Combat Support Group
	Air Force Outstanding Unit Award w/Combat "V" Device	1 April 1973-31 March 1974	635th Combat Support Group
	Vietnamese Gallantry Cross with Palm	8 July 1966-28 January 1973	635th Combat Support Group
	Vietnamese Gallantry Cross with Palm	29 April 1975-30 April 1975	635th Combat Support Group

Campaign Streamer	Campaign	Dates	Notes
	Vietnam Air Offensive	29 June 1966 – 8 March 1967	635th Combat Support Group
	Vietnam Air Offensive, Phase II	9 March 1967 – 31 March 1968	635th Combat Support Group
	Vietnam Air Offensive, Phase III	1 April 1968 – 31 October 1968	635th Combat Support Group
	Vietnam Air Offensive, Phase IV	1 November 1968 – 22 February 1969	635th Combat Support Group
	Tet 1969/Counteroffensive	23 February 1969 – 8 June 1969	635th Combat Support Group
	Vietnam Summer-Fall 1969	9 June 1969 – 31 October 1969	635th Combat Support Group
	Vietnam Winter-Spring 1970	3 November 1969 – 30 April 1970	635th Combat Support Group
	Sanctuary Counteroffensive	1 May 1970 – 30 June 1970	635th Combat Support Group
	Southwest Monsoon	1 July 1970 – 30 November 1970	635th Combat Support Group
	Commando Hunt V	1 December 1970 – 14 May 1971	635th Combat Support Group
	Commando Hunt VI	15 May 1971 – 31 July 1971	635th Combat Support Group
	Commando Hunt VII	1 November 1971 – 29 March 1972	635th Combat Support Group
	Operation Frequent Wind	29 April 1975 – 30 April 1975	635th Combat Support Group
