= Oklahoma City Air Logistics Complex =

US Air Force maintenance and logistics center in Oklahoma City, OK

Coordinates: 35°24′53″N 97°23′12″W

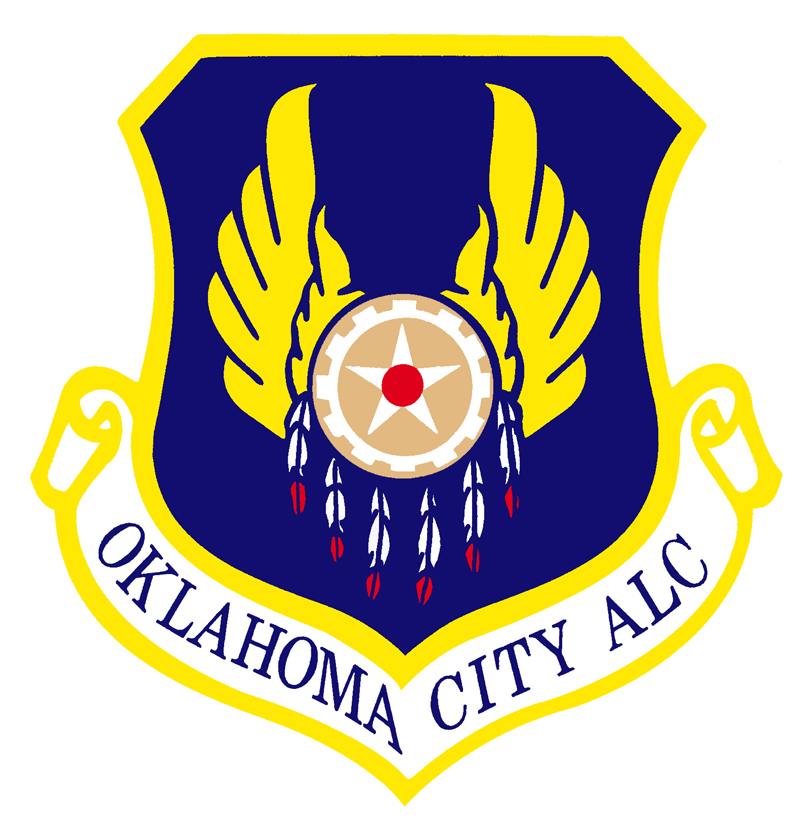
- Complex badge
- Active: 1943–present
- Country: United States
- Branch: United States Air Force
- Type: Air Logistics Complex
- Role: Logistics, support, maintenance and distribution
- Size: 10,300 personnel
- Part of: Air Force Sustainment Center
- Headquarters: Tinker Air Force Base, Oklahoma

Commanders
- Current commander: Brig Gen Brian R. Moore

The Oklahoma City Air Logistics Complex (OC-ALC) Tinker Air Force Base, Oklahoma is one of the largest units in the Air Force Materiel Command. The complex performs programmed depot maintenance on the C/KC-135, B-1B, B-52 and E-3 aircraft; expanded phase maintenance on the Navy E-6 aircraft; and maintenance, repair and overhaul of F100, F101, F108, F110, F117, F118, F119, F135, and TF33 engines for the Air Force, Air Force Reserve, Air National Guard, Navy and foreign military sales. Additionally, the complex is responsible for the maintenance, repair and overhaul of a myriad of Air Force and Navy airborne accessory components, and the development and sustainment of a diverse portfolio of operational flight programs, test program sets, automatic test equipment, and industrial automation software.

It was established as the Oklahoma Air Depot Control Area Command on 19 Jan 1943. Activated on 1 Feb 1943. Redesignated as: Oklahoma City Air Service Command on 17 May 1943; Oklahoma City Air Technical Service Command on 14 Nov 1944; Oklahoma Air Materiel Area on 2 Jul 1946; Oklahoma City Air Logistics Center on 1 Apr 1974; Oklahoma City Air Logistics Complex on 10 Jul 2012.

The 22 Air Depot was assigned to the Oklahoma City Air Depot Control Area (later, Oklahoma City Air Service) Command at the Oklahoma City Air Depot (later Tinker Field), 8 Aug 1942 - 31 December 1943, after which it was reassigned to the China-Burma-India Air Service Command.

On 15 January 1988, the 2871st Test Squadron was activated at Tinker Air Force Base, assigned to the Oklahoma City Air Logistics Center. It was redesignated the 10th Test Squadron on 1 October 1992. It was inactivated on 18 March 1994, and its resources and personnel absorbed by the 10th Flight Test Squadron.

== Structure ==
In the late 2010s, the Oklahoma City Air Logistics Complex comprised five groups and eight staff offices providing USAF maintenance, repair, and overhaul support:

- The 76th Aircraft Maintenance Group directs, manages and accomplishes organic depot-level maintenance, repair, modification, overhaul, functional check flights and reclamation of B-1, B-52, C/KC/EC-135, E-3, KC-10, C-130 and E-6 aircraft. The group conducts depot support operations on a fleet of Air Force, Air Force Reserve, Air National Guard, Navy and Foreign Military Sales aircraft, as well as expeditionary combat-logistics depot maintenance and distribution support.
- The 76th Propulsion Maintenance Group is responsible for operation of the only Air Force depot-level maintenance facility supporting Air Force and Navy aircraft engines. The group performs repairs on engines and major engine assemblies for F-15, F-16, E-3, E-6, E-8, B-52, B-1, B-2, C-17, C-18, KC/RC-135, and F/A-22 aircraft. The group has been identified as the Depot source of repair for the F-35 engine workload.
- The 76th Commodities Maintenance Group directs, manages, and operates organic depot level maintenance facilities in the restoration of Air Force and Navy aircraft and engine parts to serviceable condition. These systems include the A-10, B-1, B-2, B-52, C-5, C-17, C-130, C-135, C-141, E-3, F-4, F-5, F-15, F-16, F-22, MQ-1, MQ-9, and T-38 aircraft. The group is also the Air Force Technology Repair Center for air & fuel accessories, constant speed drives and oxygen related components.
- The 76th Maintenance Support Group manages industrial services, physical sciences laboratories, precision measurement equipment laboratories and tools for the Oklahoma City Air Logistics Complex. It provides engineering, installation, maintenance and management support for the complex's industrial plant equipment and facilities. In addition, the group provides environmental, occupational health, focal point for energy reduction and point of use technology. The group's services include Physical Plant Management, Metrology, Physical Science Laboratories, Tools Management, Environmental Oversight, and Long-Range Facility Planning.
- The 76th Software Maintenance Group was responsible for the development, modernization, and sustainment of embedded software in the Air Force's mission critical weapon systems and associated with depot, acquisition, and logistics activities. The Group's multi-skilled, highly trained and motivated workforce are focused on the Continuous Process Improvement (CPI) of software and systems engineering, including: Operational Flight Programs, Automatic Test Equipment, Test Program Sets, Jet Engine Test, Modeling and Simulation, Industrial Automation, Software Information Assurance, and multiple weapon systems software. The Group also provides engineering support to the depot sustainment and acquisition communities.

== List of commanders ==
- Brig Gen Donald Kirkland, September 2012
- Brig Gen Mark K. Johnson, March 2015
- Brig Gen Tom D. Miller, June 2017
- Brig Gen Christopher D. Hill, June 2018
- Maj Gen Jeffrey R. King, July 2020
- Brig Gen Brian R. Moore, 27 June 2023
- Brig Gen Lindsay C. Droz, 1 July 2025
