= Joseph D. Noble =

U.S. Navy admiral

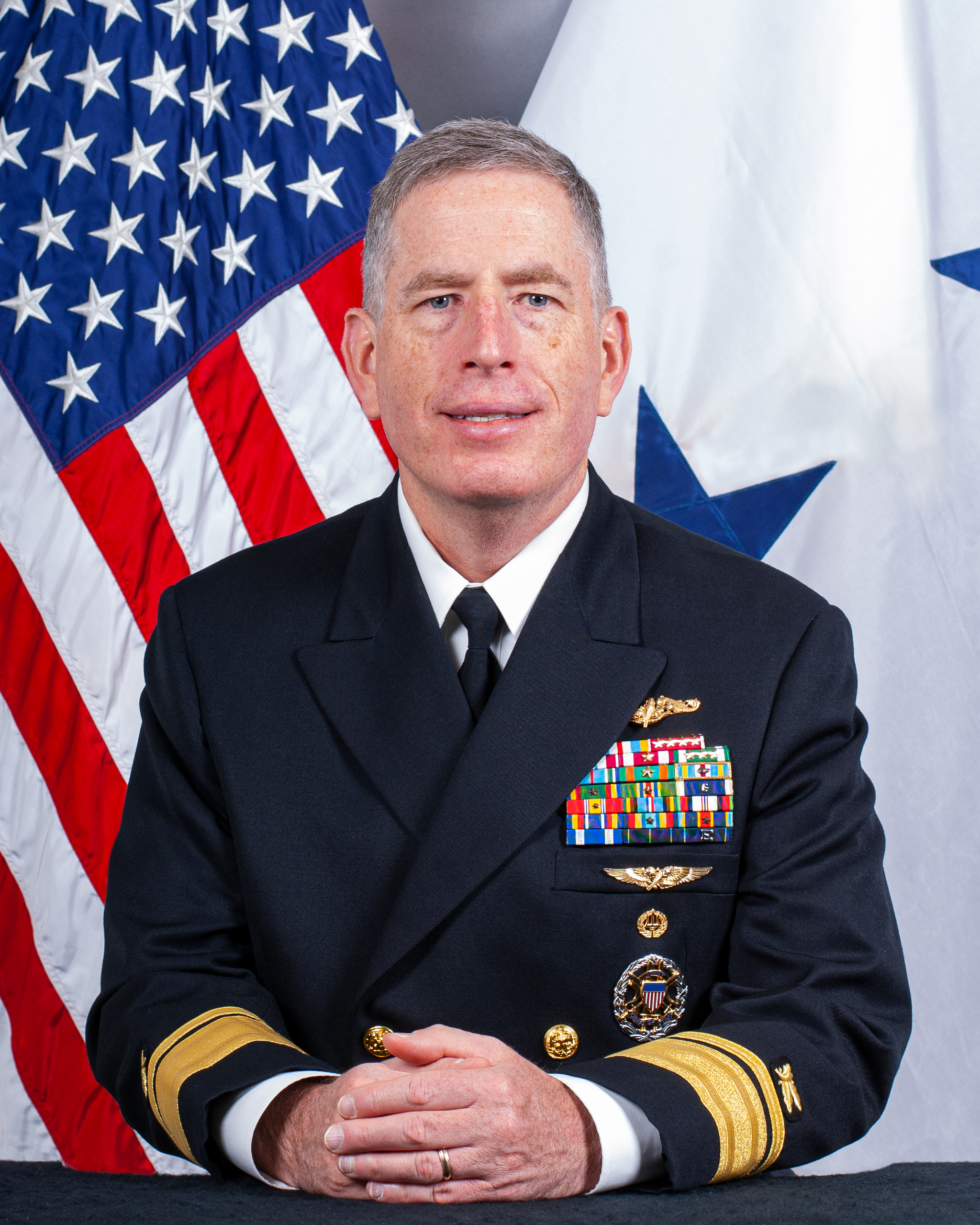
- Official portrait, 2021
- Born: 1967 (age 58–59)
- Military career
- Allegiance: United States
- Branch: United States Navy
- Service years: 1989–2024
- Rank: Rear Admiral
- Nickname: Doug
- Commands: Joint Regional Combat Support; Naval Supply Systems Command Weapon Systems Support; Navy Supply Corps School

Joseph Douglas Noble Jr. (born 1967) is a retired United States Navy rear admiral who last served as the Director of Logistics Operations of the Defense Logistics Agency and Commander of Joint Regional Combat Support from 2021 to 2024. Previously, he served as the Commander of the Naval Supply Systems Command Weapon Systems Support.

Raised in Crystal Lake, Illinois, Noble graduated from the United States Naval Academy in 1989 with a B.S. degree in electrical engineering. He was commissioned as a Supply Corps officer. Noble later earned an M.S. degree in operations research from the Naval Postgraduate School in December 2000. He has also received an M.B.A. degree from the Kelley School of Business at Indiana University.

Military offices
Preceded by ???	Commanding Officer of the Navy Supply Corps School; 2016–2018	Succeeded by Nick Rapley
Preceded by Richard D. Heinz	Commander of the Naval Supply Systems Command Weapon Systems Support; 2020–2021	Succeeded by Kenneth W. Epps
Preceded by Allan Day	Director of Logistics Operations of the Defense Logistics Agency and Commander of Joint Regional Combat Support; 2021–2024	Vacant
