= Air Force Materiel Command =

US Air Force body

- Shield of Air Force Materiel Command
- Active: 1 July 1992 – present (34 years, 2 months)
- Country: United States
- Branch: United States Air Force
- Type: Major Command
- Role: "Powering the world’s greatest Air Force…we deliver readiness and war-winning capabilities for today and tomorrow."
- Size: 77,416 Airmen; 129 aircraft
- Headquarters: Wright-Patterson Air Force Base, Dayton, Ohio, U.S.
- Decorations: Air Force Organization Excellence Award
- Website: www.afmc.af.mil

Commanders
- Commander: Lt Gen Linda S. Hurry
- Command Chief: CMSgt James E. Fitch II

Aircraft flown
- Attack: A-10C, MQ-9B
- Bomber: B-1B, B-2A, B-52H
- Fighter: F-15C/D, F-15E, F-16C/D, F-22A, F-35A
- Multirole helicopter: HH-60G, HH-60W
- Utility helicopter: UH-1N
- Reconnaissance: RC-135V/W, RQ-4B
- Trainer: T-38C
- Transport: C-5M, C-12C/D/F/J
- Tanker: KC-46A, KC-135R/T

The Air Force Materiel Command (AFMC) is a major command (MAJCOM) of the United States Air Force (USAF). AFMC was created on July 1, 1992, through the amalgamation of the former Air Force Logistics Command (AFLC) and the former Air Force Systems Command (AFSC).

AFMC is headquartered at Wright-Patterson Air Force Base in Dayton, Ohio. AFMC is one of nine Air Force major commands and has a workforce of approximately 80,000 military and civilian personnel. It is the Air Force's largest command in terms of funding and second in terms of personnel. AFMC's operating budget represents 31 percent of the total Air Force budget and AFMC employs more than 40 percent of the Air Force's total civilian workforce.

The command conducts research, development, testing and evaluation, and provides the acquisition and life cycle management services and logistics support. The command develops, acquires and sustains the air power needed to defend the United States and its interests. This is accomplished through research, development, testing, evaluation, acquisition, maintenance and program management of existing and future USAF weapon systems and their components.

== History ==
The United States Armed Forces procurement of military aircraft began when the United States Army's Aeronautical Division of the Signal Corps (United States Army), acquired several examples of the Wright Military Flyer of 1909. USAAF/USAF aircraft Research and Development (R&D) was merged with aircraft procurement twice in the 20th century (e.g., 1944, 1992).

Air Materiel Command was established on March 9, 1946, and in November 1946, AMC's History Office published Materiel Research and Development in the Army Air Arm, 1914-1945. In 1947, AMC bases were transferred to the newly established United States Air Force, with facilities such as the storage depot in Maywood, California, being renamed Cheli Air Force Station.

On April 1, 1961, as part of the DoD reorganization under President John F. Kennedy and his secretary of defense, Robert S. McNamara, the Air Force Logistics Command was established at Wright-Patterson Air Force Base, replacing the Air Materiel Command and assuming the latter's supply and maintenance roles. The material procurement role was transferred. On the same date, Air Force Systems Command was also established at Andrews Air Force Base, Maryland, assuming the R&D role of the former Air Research and Development Command while also inheriting AMC's materiel procurement role.

=== Activation duties AFMC, 1992 ===
Air Force Materiel Command (AFMC) was activated on July 1, 1992, as part of a post-Cold War, USAF-wide reorganization that resulted in the merger of AFLC and AFSC into a single major command.

After AFMC was established, the command's infrastructure saw significant reductions through Base Realignment and Closure (BRAC) actions. This included the BRAC-directed closure/privatization of the San Antonio Air Logistics Center at Kelly Air Force Base, Texas, and the closure of Kelly Air Force Base as an independent installation, with incorporation of its runways and remaining military flight line areas as the Kelly Field Annex to adjacent Lackland Air Force Base.

The Sacramento Air Logistics Center at McClellan Air Force Base was also closed/privatized and McClellan Air Force Base totally closed. McClellan became a totally civilian airport with the exception of Coast Guard Air Station Sacramento and the Air Force Recruiting Service's 364th Recruiting Squadron.

=== Reorganization ===
In 2012 there was a major reorganization (5 Center Construct) and several new centers were organized. Among them, the Air Force Sustainment Center at Tinker Air Force Base now directs the Oklahoma City Air Logistics Complex at Tinker Air Force Base, the Ogden Air Logistics Complex at Hill Air Force Base, and the Warner Robins Air Logistics Complex at Robins Air Force Base. The center provides depot maintenance, supply chain management and installation support. In 2015, the command officially activated its sixth center, the Air Force Installation and Mission Support Center, which provides centralized management of installation and mission support. The center is located at Joint Base San Antonio, Texas.

== Mission ==
Air Force Materiel Command conducts research, development, test and evaluation, and provides acquisition management services and logistics support.

AFMC headquarters is the major unit located at Wright-Patterson Air Force Base, Ohio. There are also nine additional AFMC host bases.

In addition, the command operates associate units and tenant activities on several non-AFMC bases, including the Air Force Nuclear Weapons Center at Kirtland Air Force Base, New Mexico.

== Component units ==
=== Headquarters ===
- Headquarters Air Force Materiel Command (Wright-Patterson AFB, Ohio)

=== Air Force Installation and Mission Support Center ===
The Air Force Installation and Mission Support Center (AFIMSC) serves as the single intermediate-level headquarters responsible for providing installation and mission support capabilities. Its headquarters are located at Joint Base San Antonio-Lackland, Texas and it has the following subordinate units.

- Air Force Civil Engineer Center (Joint Base San Antonio-Lackland, Texas)
- Air Force Installation Contracting Center (Wright-Patterson AFB, Ohio)
- Air Force Security Forces Center (Joint Base Antonio-Lackland, Texas)
- Air Force Services Center (Joint Base San Antonio-Lackland, Texas)

=== Air Force Life Cycle Management Center ===
The Air Force Life Cycle Management Center's (AFLCMC) mission is to deliver affordable and sustainable combat capabilities to US and international partners. It is the single center responsible for total life cycle management of all aircraft, engines, munitions, and electronic systems. Its headquarters are located at Wright-Patterson AFB, Ohio and it has the following subordinate units.

- 66th Air Base Group (Hanscom AFB, Massachusetts)
- 88th Air Base Wing (Wright-Patterson AFB, Ohio)
- Acquisition Excellence Directorate (Wright-Patterson AFB, Ohio)
- Agile Combat Support Directorate (Wright-Patterson AFB, Ohio)
- Air Force Security Assistance & Cooperation Directorate (Wright-Patterson AFB, Ohio)
- Armament Directorate (Eglin AFB, Florida)
- Bombers Directorate (Wright-Patterson AFB, Ohio)
- Business & Enterprise Systems Directorate (Gunter Annex, Maxwell AFB, Alabama)
- Command, Control, Communications and Intelligence (C3I) and Networks Directorate
- Digital Directorate (Hanscom AFB, Massachusetts)
- Fighters & Advanced Aircraft Directorate (Wright-Patterson AFB, Ohio)
- Intelligence, Surveillance and Reconnaissance (ISR) and Special Operations Force (SOF) Directorate (Wright-Patterson AFB, Ohio)
- Mobility & Training Aircraft Directorate (Wright-Patterson AFB, Ohio)
- Presidential and Executive Airlift Directorate (Wright-Patterson AFB, Ohio)
- Program Execution Directorate (Wright-Patterson AFB, Ohio)
- Propulsion Directorate (Tinker AFB, Oklahoma)
- Rapid Sustainment Directorate (Wright-Patterson AFB, Ohio)

=== Air Force Nuclear Weapons Center ===
The Air Force Nuclear Weapons Center (AFNWC) is the Air Force's nuclear-focused center, synchronizing all aspects of nuclear materiel management in support of Air Force Global Strike Command. Its headquarters are located at Kirtland AFB, New Mexico and it has the following subordinate units.

- Air-Delivered Capabilities Directorate (Kirtland AFB)
- Ground Based Strategic Deterrent Systems Directorate (Hill AFB, Utah)
- Minuteman III Systems Directorate (Hill AFB, Utah)
- Nuclear Command, Control, and Communications (NC3) Integration Directorate (Hanscom AFB, Massachusetts)
- Nuclear Technology and Integration Directorate (Kirtland AFB)

=== Air Force Research Laboratory ===
The Air Force Research Laboratory (AFRL) is the Air Force's only organization dedicated to leading the discovery, development and integration of technologies in air, space and cyber for the US Air and Space Forces. Its headquarters are located at Wright-Patterson AFB, Ohio and it has the following subordinate units.

- 711th Human Performance Wing (Wright-Patterson AFB, Ohio)
- Aerospace Systems Directorate (Wright-Patterson AFB, Ohio)
- Air Force Office of Scientific Research (Arlington, Virginia)
- Air Force Strategic Development Planning and Experimentation Office (Wright-Patterson AFB, Ohio)
- Directed Energy Directorate (Kirtland AFB, New Mexico)
- Information Directorate (Rome Research Site, New York)
- Materials and Manufacturing Directorate (Wright-Patterson AFB, Ohio)
- Munitions Directorate (Eglin AFB, Florida)
- Sensors Directorate (Wright-Patterson AFB, Ohio)
- Space Vehicles (Kirtland AFB, New Mexico)

=== Air Force Sustainment Center ===
The mission of the Air Force Sustainment Center (AFSC) is to provide sustainment and logistics readiness. The center provides integrated logistics and sustainment to the Air Force through depot maintenance, supply chain management and installation support. Its headquarters are located at Tinker Air Force Base, Oklahoma and it has the following subordinate units.

- 72nd Air Base Wing (Tinker Air Force Base, Oklahoma)
- 75th Air Base Wing (Hill Air Force Base, Utah)
- 78th Air Base Wing (Robins Air Force Base, Georgia)
- 448th Supply Chain Management Wing (Tinker Air Force Base, Oklahoma)
- 635th Supply Chain Operations Wing (Scott AFB, Illinois)
- Ogden Air Logistics Complex (Hill Air Force Base, Utah)
- Oklahoma City Air Logistics Complex (Tinker Air Force Base, Oklahoma)
- Warner Robins Air Logistics Complex (Robins Air Force Base, Georgia)

=== Air Force Test Center ===
The Air Force Test Center (AFTC) conducts developmental and follow-on testing and evaluation of crewed and uncrewed aircraft and related avionics, flight-control, munitions, and weapon systems. Its headquarters are located at Edwards AFB, California and it has the following subordinate units.

- 96th Test Wing (Eglin AFB, Florida)
- 412th Test Wing (Edwards AFB, California)
- Arnold Engineering Development Complex (Arnold AFB, Tennessee)

=== Other units ===
- National Museum of the US Air Force (Wright-Patterson AFB, Ohio)

== Commanders ==
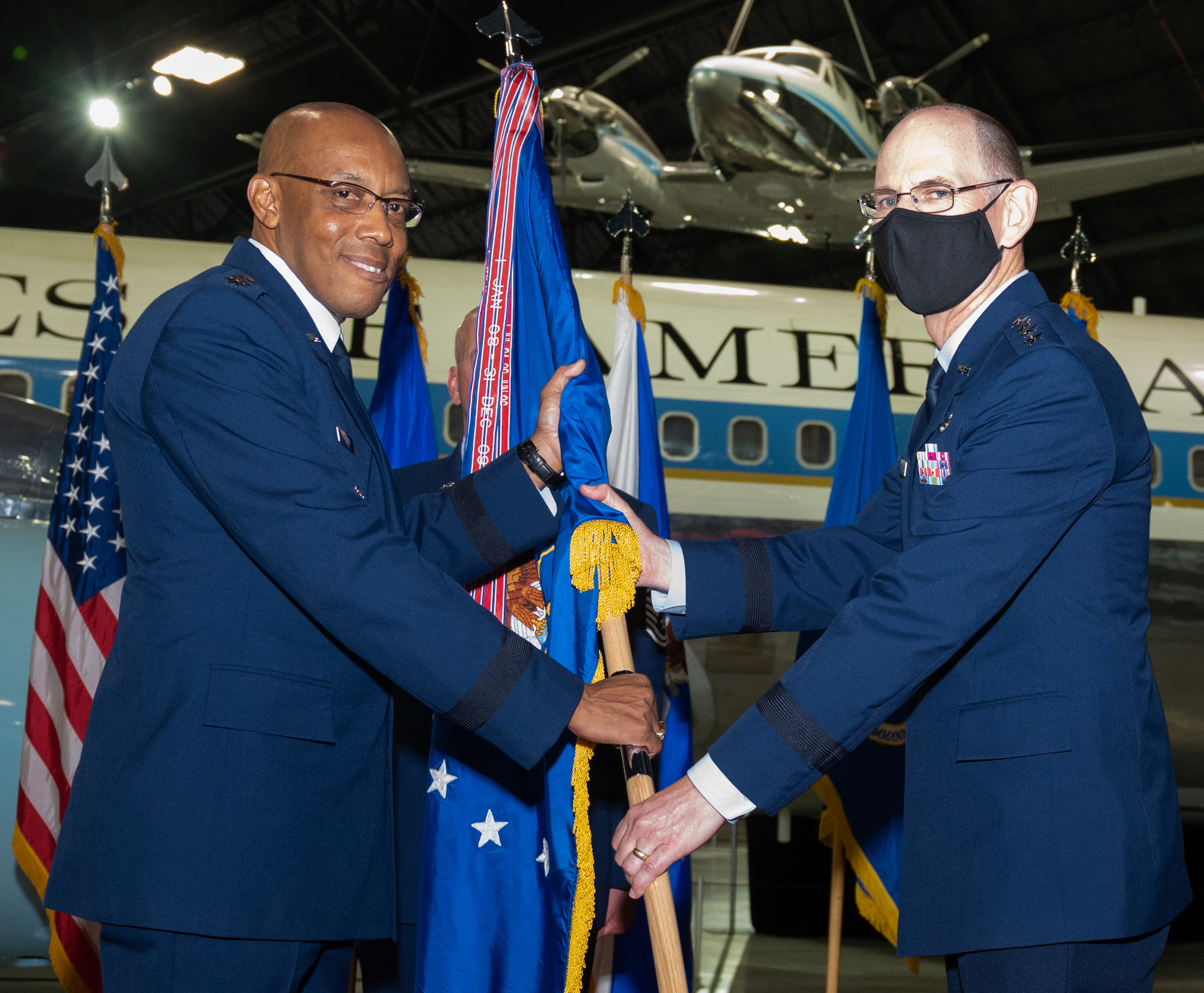
Gen Duke Z. Richardson assumes command of AFMC on 13 June 2022.

No.	Commander		Term		
No.	Portrait	Name	Took office	Left office	Term length
1	Ronald W. Yates	General; Ronald W. Yates (born 1938)	1 July 1992	30 June 1995	2 years, 364 days
2	Henry Viccellio Jr.	General; Henry Viccellio Jr. (born 1940)	30 June 1995	9 May 1997	1 year, 313 days
–	Kenneth E. Eickmann	Lieutenant General; Kenneth E. Eickmann; Acting	9 May 1997	29 May 1997	20 days
3	George T. Babbitt Jr.	General; George T. Babbitt Jr. (born 1942)	29 May 1997	20 April 2000	2 years, 327 days
4	Lester Lyles	General; Lester Lyles (born 1946)	20 April 2000	22 August 2003	3 years, 124 days
5	Gregory S. Martin	General; Gregory S. Martin (born 1948)	22 August 2003	19 August 2005	1 year, 362 days
6	Bruce A. Carlson	General; Bruce A. Carlson (born 1949)	19 August 2005	21 November 2008	3 years, 94 days
7	Donald J. Hoffman	General; Donald J. Hoffman (born 1952)	21 November 2008	5 June 2012	3 years, 197 days
8	Janet C. Wolfenbarger	General; Janet C. Wolfenbarger (born 1958)	5 June 2012	8 June 2015	3 years, 3 days
9	Ellen M. Pawlikowski	General; Ellen M. Pawlikowski (born 1956)	8 June 2015	8 August 2018	3 years, 61 days
–	Robert D. McMurry Jr.	Lieutenant General; Robert D. McMurry Jr. Acting	8 August 2018	31 May 2019	296 days
10	Arnold W. Bunch Jr.	General; Arnold W. Bunch Jr. (born 1962)	31 May 2019	13 June 2022	3 years, 13 days
11	Duke Z. Richardson	General; Duke Z. Richardson (born c. 1964)	13 June 2022	3 July 2025	3 years, 20 days
–	Linda Hurry	Lieutenant General; Linda Hurry (born c. 1969); Acting	3 July 2025	30 January 2026	211 days
12	Linda Hurry	Lieutenant General; Linda Hurry (born c. 1969)	30 January 2026	Incumbent	224 days

== See also ==
U.S. Armed Forces systems commands

- Army Materiel Command
- Marine Corps Systems Command
- United States Navy systems commands
  - Naval Sea Systems Command
  - Naval Air Systems Command
  - Naval Information Warfare Systems Command
  - Naval Facilities Engineering Systems Command
  - Naval Supply Systems Command
- Space Systems Command
