= Commander of the Air Force Research Laboratory =

The commander of Air Force Research Laboratory (AFRL) is responsible for managing the Air Force's science and technology program as well as additional customer funded research and development. The commander is also responsible for a workforce of approximately 10,800 people in the laboratory's component technology directorates, the Air Force Office of Scientific Research, and the 711th Human Performance Wing.

Below is a list of commanders of Air Force Research Laboratory and the terms in office.

== List of commanders of the Air Force Research Laboratory ==
No.	Photo	Name	Term start	Term end	Term length
1		Major General; Richard R. Paul	Apr 1997	2000	
2		Major General; Paul D. Nielsen	Apr 2000	2004	
3		Major General; Perry L. Lamy	Jun 2004	Nov 2005	
4		Major General; Ted F. Bowlds	January 2006	November 2007	
5		Major General; Curtis M. Bedke	Oct 2007	Feb 2010	
6		Major General; Ellen M. Pawlikowski	February 12, 2010	May 2011	
7		Major General; Neil McCasland	May 2011	July 2013	
8		Major General; Thomas J. Masiello	July 29, 2013	May 2016	
9		Major General; Robert D. McMurry Jr.	May 2016	May 2, 2017	
10		Major General; William T. Cooley	May 2, 2017	January 15, 2020	2 years, 258 days
11		Brigadier General; Evan Dertien	January 15, 2020	June 18, 2020	155 days
12		Major General; Heather L. Pringle	June 18, 2020	June 5, 2023	2 years, 352 days
13		Major General; Scott A. Cain	June 5, 2023	July 10, 2024	1 year, 35 days
14		Brigadier General; Jason E. Bartolomei	July 10, 2024	Incumbent	2 years, 33 days
