= Deputy Chief of Staff for Operations of the United States Air Force =

- Headquarters Air Force identification badge

- Flag of an Air Force lieutenant general

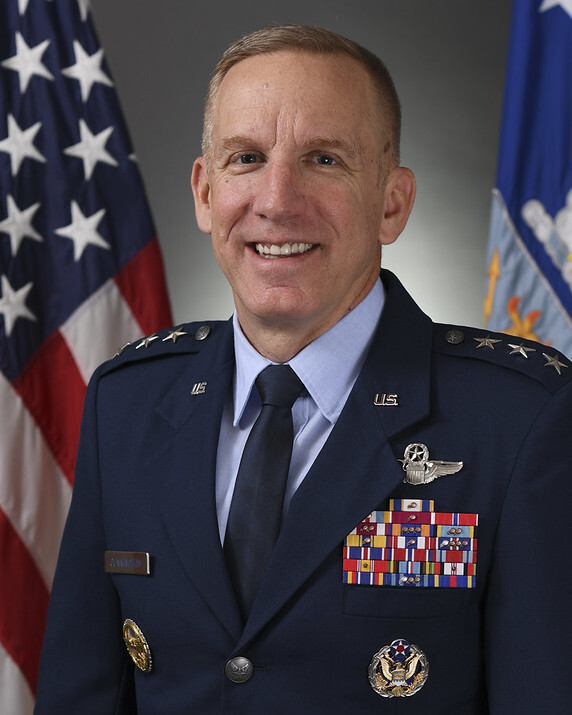
- Incumbent; Lieutenant General Case A. Cunningham since 15 October 2025
- United States Air Force
- Abbreviation: A3
- Member of: Air Staff
- Reports to: Secretary of the Air Force; Chief of Staff of the United States Air Force
- Appointer: The president; with Senate advice and consent
- Formation: 1 July 1957
- First holder: John K. Gerhart
- Deputy: Assistant Deputy Chief of Staff for Operations of the United States Air Force

The deputy chief of staff for operations of the United States Air Force is a position in the United States Air Force tasked with the development and implementation of policy directly supporting global operations, force management, weather, training and readiness across air, space and cyber fields. Commonly referred to as the A3, it is held by a lieutenant general who serves as the operations deputy to the chief of staff of the U.S. Air Force. The position is one of ten senior positions in the headquarters of the U.S. Air Force. As such, the officeholder of this position serves in the Air Staff.

== Organization ==
- Deputy Chief of Staff for Operations: Lt Gen Case A. Cunningham
  - Assistant Deputy Chief of Staff for Operations: Maj Gen John M. Klein Jr.
    - Director of Current Operations: Brig Gen Daniel T. Lasica
    - Director of Training and Readiness: Maj Gen Albert G. Miller

== List of deputy chiefs of staff for operations ==
No.	Deputy Chief of Staff		Term		
No.	Portrait	Name	Took office	Left office	Term length
Deputy Chief of Staff for Plans and Programs
1	John K. Gerhart	Lieutenant General; John K. Gerhart	1 July 1957	21 July 1962	5 years, 20 days
2	David A. Burchinal	Lieutenant General; David A. Burchinal	1 August 1962	31 January 1963	183 days
Deputy Chief of Staff for Plans and Programs
2	David A. Burchinal	Lieutenant General; David A. Burchinal	1 February 1963	23 February 1964	1 year, 22 days
3	William H. Blanchard	Lieutenant General; William H. Blanchard	24 February 1964	8 February 1965	350 days
4	Keith K. Compton	Lieutenant General; Keith K. Compton	19 February 1965	31 January 1967	1 year, 346 days
5	Glen W. Martin	Lieutenant General; Glen W. Martin	1 February 1967	31 July 1969	2 years, 180 days
6	Lucius D. Clay Jr.	Lieutenant General; Lucius D. Clay Jr.	1 August 1969	31 January 1970	183 days
7	Russell E. Dougherty	Lieutenant General; Russell E. Dougherty	1 February 1970	31 March 1971	1 year, 58 days
8	George J. Eade	Lieutenant General; George J. Eade	1 April 1971	17 April 1973	2 years, 16 days
9	Joseph G. Wilson	Lieutenant General; Joseph G. Wilson	18 April 1973	31 October 1973	196 days
10	Robert E. Huyser	Lieutenant General; Robert E. Huyser	1 November 1973	31 August 1975	1 year, 303 days
11	John W. Pauly	Lieutenant General; John W. Pauly	1 September 1975	30 June 1976	303 days
12	Andrew B. Anderson Jr.	Lieutenant General; Andrew B. Anderson Jr.	1 July 1976	29 June 1978	1 year, 363 days
Deputy Chief of Staff for Operations, Plans, and Readiness
12	Andrew B. Anderson Jr.	Lieutenant General; Andrew B. Anderson Jr.	30 June 1978	1 April 1979	275 days
13	Charles A. Gabriel	Lieutenant General; Charles A. Gabriel	1 April 1979	31 July 1980	1 year, 121 days
14	Jerome F. O'Malley	Lieutenant General; Jerome F. O'Malley	1 August 1980	13 April 1981	255 days
Deputy Chief of Staff for Plans and Operations
14	Jerome F. O'Malley	Lieutenant General; Jerome F. O'Malley	14 April 1981	31 May 1982	1 year, 47 days
15	John T. Chain	Lieutenant General; John T. Chain	1 June 1982	17 June 1984	2 years, 16 days
16	David L. Nichols	Lieutenant General; David L. Nichols	30 June 1984	12 September 1985	1 year, 74 days
17	Harley Hughes	Lieutenant General; Harley Hughes	13 September 1985	29 February 1988	2 years, 169 days
18	Michael J. Dugan	Lieutenant General; Michael J. Dugan	1 March 1988	30 April 1989	1 year, 60 days
19	Jimmie V. Adams	Lieutenant General; Jimmie V. Adams	1 May 1989	8 February 1991	1 year, 283 days
20	Michael A. Nelson	Lieutenant General; Michael A. Nelson	9 February 1991	22 May 1992	1 year, 103 days
21	Buster C. Glosson	Lieutenant General; Buster C. Glosson	29 May 1992	30 June 1994	2 years, 32 days
22	Joseph W. Ralston	Lieutenant General; Joseph W. Ralston	25 July 1994	2 June 1995	312 days
23	Ralph E. Eberhart	Lieutenant General; Ralph E. Eberhart	5 June 1995	7 June 1996	1 year, 2 days
24	John P. Jumper	Lieutenant General; John P. Jumper	11 June 1996	31 December 1996	203 days
Deputy Chief of Staff for Air and Space Operations
24	John P. Jumper	Lieutenant General; John P. Jumper	1 January 1997	17 November 1997	320 days
25	Patrick K. Gamble	Lieutenant General; Patrick K. Gamble	24 November 1997	July 1998	~219 days
26	Marvin R. Esmond	Lieutenant General; Marvin R. Esmond	15 July 1998	May 2000	~1 year, 291 days
27	Glen W. Moorhead	Lieutenant General; Glen W. Moorhead	May 2000	August 2000	~92 days
28	Robert H. Foglesong	Lieutenant General; Robert H. Foglesong	August 2000	November 2001	~1 year, 92 days
29	Charles F. Wald	Lieutenant General; Charles F. Wald	November 2001	August 2002	~273 days
30	John C. Koziol	Major General; John C. Koziol	August 2002	October 2003	~1 year, 61 days
31	Ronald E. Keys	Lieutenant General; Ronald E. Keys	November 2002	May 2005	~2 years, 181 days
Deputy Chief of Staff for Operations, Plans, and Requirements
-	Richard Y. Newton III	Major General; Richard Y. Newton III; Acting	June 2005	September 2005	~194 days
32	Carrol H. Chandler	Lieutenant General; Carrol H. Chandler	October 2005	November 2007	~194 days
33	Daniel J. Darnell	Lieutenant General; Daniel J. Darnell	November 2007	June 2009	~194 days
34	Philip M. Breedlove	Lieutenant General; Philip M. Breedlove	August 2009	3 January 2011	~194 days
35	Herbert J. Carlisle	Lieutenant General; Herbert J. Carlisle	3 January 2011	July 2012	~194 days
36	Burton M. Field	Lieutenant General; Burton M. Field	July 2012	~19 December 2014	~194 days
Deputy Chief of Staff for Operations
37	Tod D. Wolters	Lieutenant General; Tod D. Wolters	~19 December 2014	July 2015	~194 days
38	John W. Raymond	Lieutenant General; John W. Raymond	~14 August 2015	~25 October 2016	~1 year, 72 days
39	Mark Nowland	Lieutenant General; Mark Nowland	~25 October 2016	~3 August 2018	~1 year, 280 days
40	Mark D. Kelly	Lieutenant General; Mark D. Kelly	~3 August 2018	~28 August 2020	~2 years, 25 days
41	Joseph T. Guastella	Lieutenant General; Joseph T. Guastella	~28 August 2020	July 2022	~1 year, 321 days
–	Charles Corcoran	Major General; Charles Corcoran; Acting	July 2022	December 2022	~147 days
42	James C. Slife	Lieutenant General; James C. Slife	December 2022	19 December 2023	~1 year, 10 days
43	Adrian Spain	Lieutenant General; Adrian Spain	19 December 2023	11 August 2025	1 year, 235 days
44	Case Cunningham	Lieutenant General; Case Cunningham	15 October 2025	Incumbent	1 year, 4 days

== See also ==
- Air Staff
- United States Air Force
