= Heather Pringle =

Heather Pringle may refer to:

- Heather L. Pringle, United States Air Force general
- Heather Pringle (writer), Canadian freelance science writer
