= Kenneth Bibb =

U.S. Air Force general

Kenneth T. Bibb Jr.
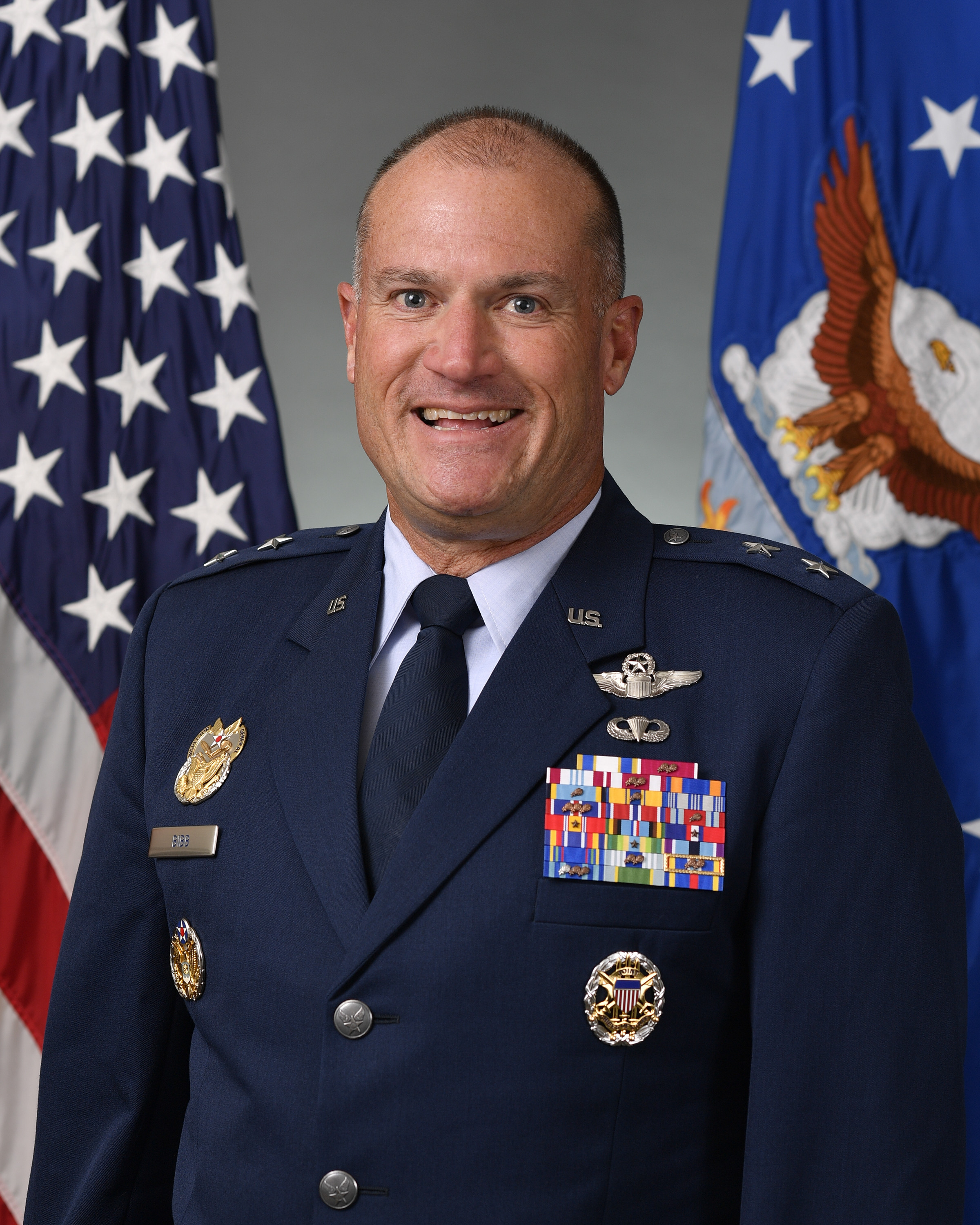
- Born: Kenneth Thad Bibb Jr. Broken Arrow, Oklahoma, U.S.
- Military career
- Allegiance: United States
- Branch: United States Air Force
- Service years: 1991–2024
- Rank: Major General
- Commands: Eighteenth Air Force; 618th Air Operations Center; 100th Air Refueling Wing
- Awards: Legion of Merit (3)

Kenneth Thad Bibb Jr. is a retired United States Air Force major general who served as the deputy inspector general of the Department of the Air Force for Air from 2022 to 2024. He most recently served as the commander of the Eighteenth Air Force from 2020 to 2022. Previously, he was the director of strategic plans, programs, requirements, and analyses of the Air Force Materiel Command.

== Dates of promotion ==
Insignia	Rank	Date
	Major general	Oct. 2, 2019
	Brigadier general	Aug. 2, 2016
	Colonel	Oct. 1, 2010
	Lieutenant colonel	Dec. 1, 2006
	Major	March 1, 2002
	Captain	May 29, 1995
	First lieutenant	May 29, 1993
	Second lieutenant	May 29, 1991

Military offices
Preceded by Brian S. Robinson	Vice Commander of the 618th Air Operations Center; 2015–2016	Succeeded by Charles B. McDaniel
Preceded by Brian S. Robinson	Commander of the 618th Air Operations Center; 2016–2018	Succeeded by John Lamontagne
Preceded by Christopher Azzano	Director of Air, Space, and Cyberspace Operations of the Air Force Materiel Command; 2018–2019	Succeeded by Evan Dertien
Preceded by Heather L. Pringle	Director of Strategic Plans, Programs, Requirements, and Analyses of the Air Force Materiel Command; 2019–2020	Succeeded by Donna D. Shipton
Preceded by Sam C. Barrett	Commander of the Eighteenth Air Force; 2020–2022	Succeeded by Corey Martin
Preceded by John C. Walker	Deputy Inspector General of the Department of the Air Force for Air; 2022–2024	Succeeded by Joel W. Safranek
