= Robert McMurry =

U.S. Air Force general

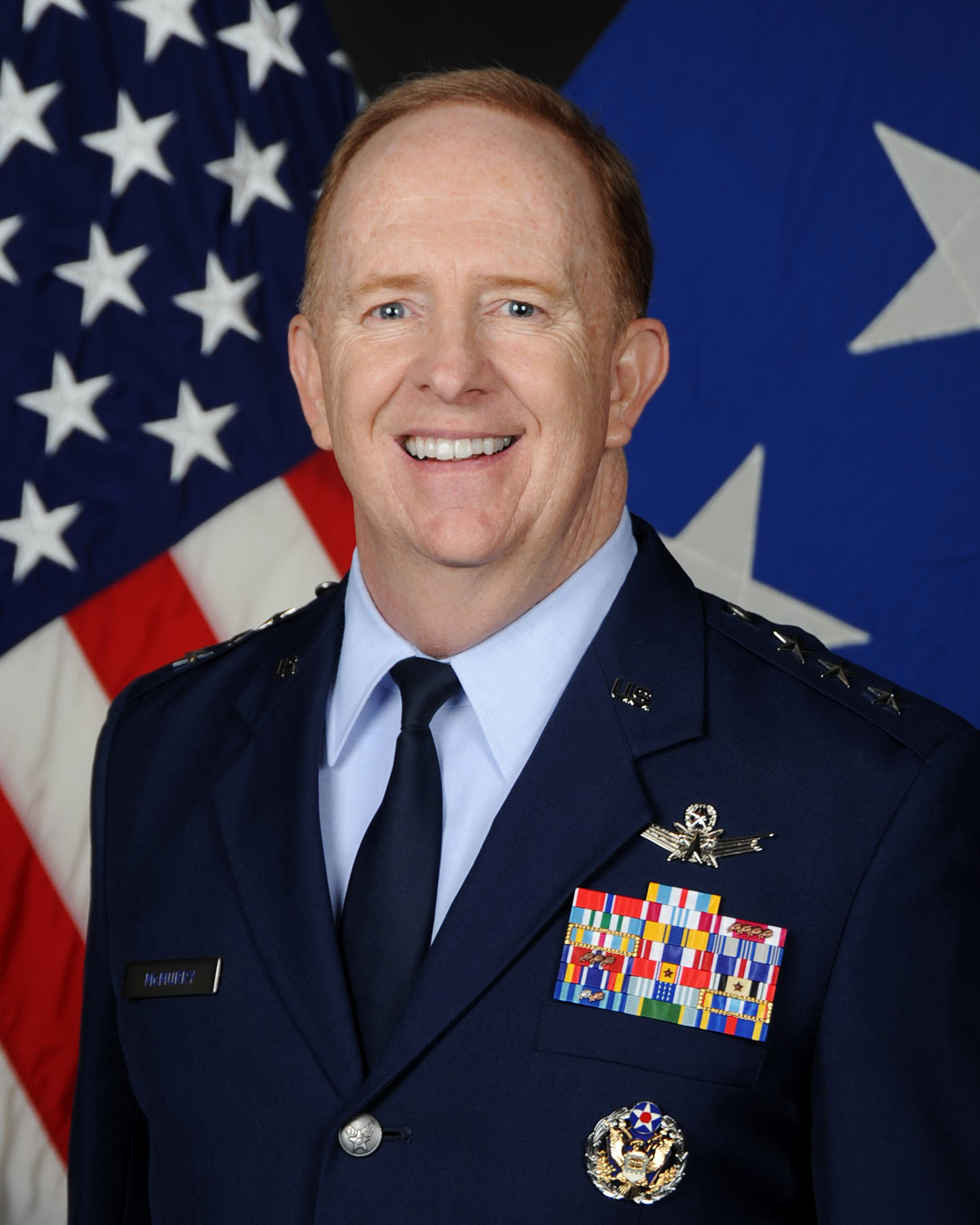
- Official portrait, 2018
- Military career
- Allegiance: United States
- Branch: United States Air Force
- Service years: 1984–2020
- Rank: Lieutenant General
- Commands: Air Force Materiel Command; Air Force Life Cycle Management Center; Air Force Research Laboratory; Airborne Laser Systems Program Office; 508th Aircraft Sustainment Group
- Awards: Air Force Distinguished Service Medal (2); Defense Superior Service Medal; Bronze Star Medal

Robert D. McMurry Jr. is a retired United States Air Force Lieutenant General who is now an executive vice president at Dayton Aerospace and a member of its board of directors. In the U.S. Air Force, he last served as the Commander of the Air Force Life Cycle Management Center. Prior to that, he was the Commander of the Air Force Research Laboratory.

McMurry earned a B.S. degree in electrical engineering from the University of Texas at Austin in 1984. He later received an M.S. degree in control and systems engineering from the University of West Florida in 1993, an M.A. degree in national security and strategic studies from the College of Naval Command and Staff at the Naval War College in 1998 and an M.S. degree in strategic studies from the Air War College in 2002.

Military offices
Preceded by John E. Hyten	Director for Space Programs of the Office of the Assistant Secretary for Acquisition; 2012–2014	Succeeded by Roger Teague
Preceded by Terrence Feehan	Vice Commander of the Space and Missile Systems Center; 2014–2016	Succeeded by Mark Baird
Preceded by Thomas J. Masiello	Commander of the Air Force Research Laboratory; 2016–2017	Succeeded by William T. Cooley
Preceded by John F. Thompson	Commander of the Air Force Life Cycle Management Center; 2017–2020	Succeeded by Shaun Morris
Preceded by Ellen M. Pawlikowski	Commander of the Air Force Materiel Command; Acting; 2018–2019	Succeeded by Arnold W. Bunch Jr.
