= William T. Cooley =

U.S. Air Force general

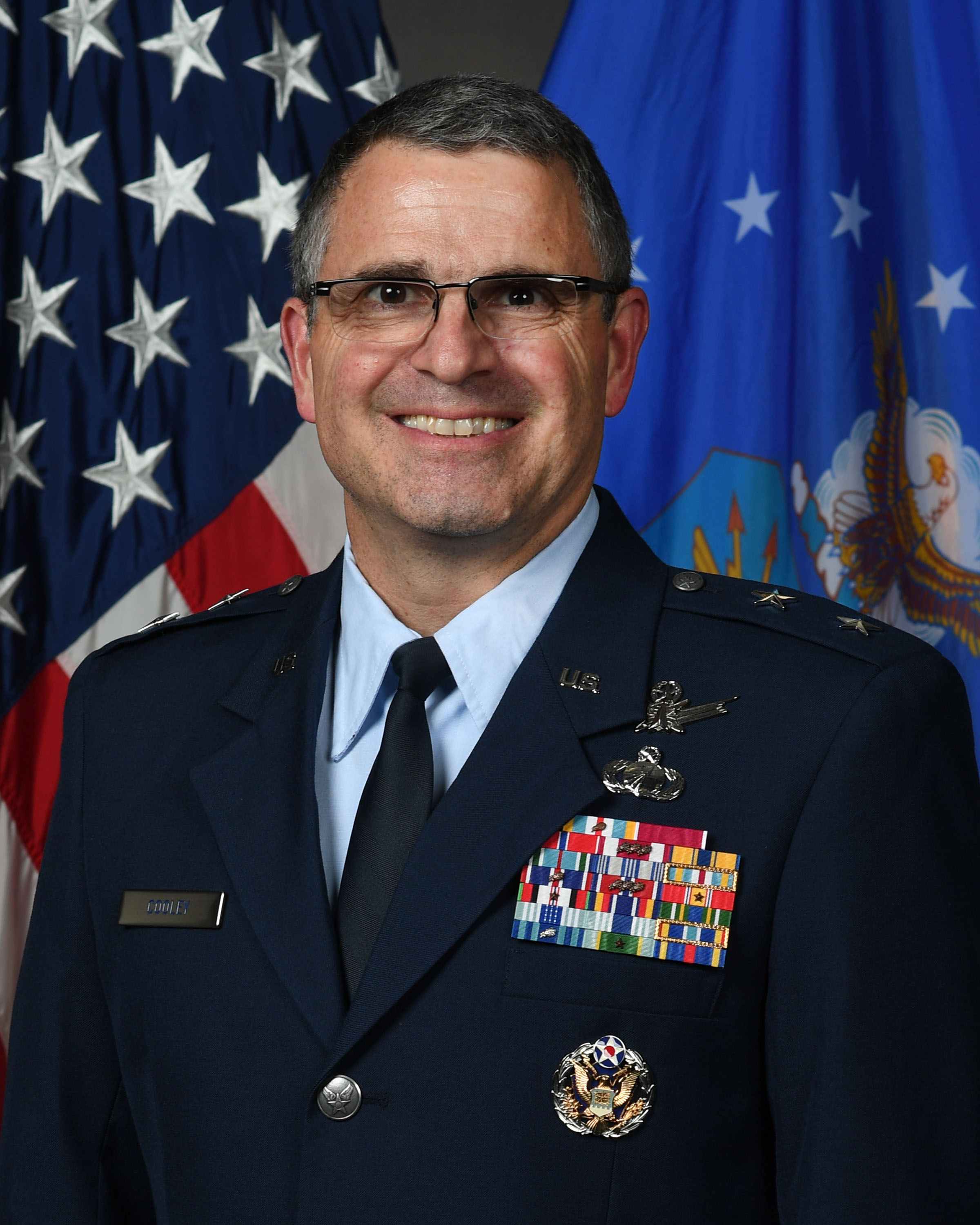
- Born: William Theodore Cooley; February 4, 1966 (age 60); Fort Worth, Texas, U.S.
- Military career
- Allegiance: United States
- Branch: United States Air Force
- Service years: 1988–2023
- Rank: Colonel (Highest grade: Major General)
- Nickname: Bill
- Commands: Air Force Research Laboratory; Global Positioning Systems Directorate; Phillips Research Site; 350th Electronic Systems Group
- Awards: Defense Superior Service Medal (2); Legion of Merit; Bronze Star Medal
- Scientific career
- Education: Rensselaer Polytechnic Institute (BS); University of New Mexico (MS); Air Force Institute of Technology (PhD)
- Fields: Applied Physics; Laser weapons
- Workplaces: Sandia National Laboratory; Air Force Wright Laboratory; Air Force Phillips Laboratory
- Thesis: Measurement of ultrafast carrier recombination dynamics in mid-infrared semiconductor laser material (1997)
- Doctoral advisor: Robert Hengehold

William Theodore Cooley (born February 4, 1966) is a retired senior United States Air Force officer who previously served as commander of the Air Force Research Laboratory. He is the first general officer in US Air Force history to be court-martialed. He was relieved of command after allegations of abusive sexual contact against him were reported. After a General Court Martial found him guilty of abusive sexual contact, Air Force Secretary Frank Kendall chose to demote the two-star general to a field-grade officer. Cooley retired as a colonel.

== Early life and education ==
William Theodore Cooley was born in Fort Worth, Texas, on February 4, 1966. He graduated from Highland High School in Albuquerque, New Mexico, in 1984. He attended Rensselaer Polytechnic Institute on an Air Force ROTC scholarship from which he received a Bachelor of Science degree in mechanical engineering in 1988 and was commissioned a second lieutenant in the US Air Force. After leaving Rensselaer, Cooley attended graduate school at the University of New Mexico and received a Masters of Science in mechanical engineering in 1990 while simultaneously working at the Sandia National Laboratory. After leaving New Mexico, Cooley worked from 1990 to 1993 at Air Force Wright Laboratory at Wright-Patterson AFB on photovoltaic solar cells and later crystal growth of III-V compounds using molecular beam epitaxy. In 1993, Cooley entered the doctoral program at Air Force Institute of Technology. He received a Doctor of Philosophy in applied physics in 1997 while working under the supervision of Professor Robert Hengehold.

== Military career ==
Cooley was commissioned a second lieutenant in the US Air Force after completing the Air Force ROTC program at Rensselaer Polytechnic Institute in 1988. In 2015, Cooley was promoted to brigadier general. In 2023 he was demoted before retirement to the rank of Colonel.

== Abusive sexual contact allegations and court-martial ==
Cooley faced a general court-martial at Wright-Patterson Air Force Base in Ohio in April 2022, charged with three counts of violating Article 120 of the Uniform Code of Military Justice by committing abusive sexual contact. On April 23, 2022, Cooley was found guilty of one count abusive sexual contact for forcibly kissing his sister-in-law after a family barbecue. Cooley was sentenced on April 26, 2022, to a public reprimand and total forfeiture of $54,550 in pay over a five-month period. He is the first general officer in US Air Force history to be court-martialed. An appeal with the Air Force Court of Criminal Appeals is pending. The findings and sentence were affirmed July 29, 2025. Appeal Verdict

== Awards and decorations ==
Cooley has been awarded and is authorized to wear the following major honors as of June 2020:

Defense Superior Service Medal
Legion of Merit
Bronze Star Medal
Meritorious Service Medal with three oak leaf clusters
Air Force Commendation Medal
Joint Service Achievement Medal
Air Force Achievement Medal

== Effective dates of promotion before demotion ==
Insignia	Rank	Date
	Major general	3 July 2018
	Brigadier general	1 March 2015
	Colonel	1 September 2007
	Lieutenant colonel	1 March 2004
	Major	1 October 1999
	Captain	19 June 1992
	First lieutenant	19 June 1990
	Second lieutenant	19 May 1988

Military offices
Preceded by Bernard Gruber	Director of the Global Positioning Systems Directorate; 2013–2015	Succeeded by Steven P. Whitney
Preceded by Ole Knudson	Program Executive for Programs and Integration of the Missile Defense Agency; 2015–2017	Succeeded by Michael Guetlein
Preceded by Robert McMurry	Commander of the Air Force Research Laboratory; 2017–2020	Succeeded by Evan Dertien
