= Air Force Test Center =

US Air Force flight test center

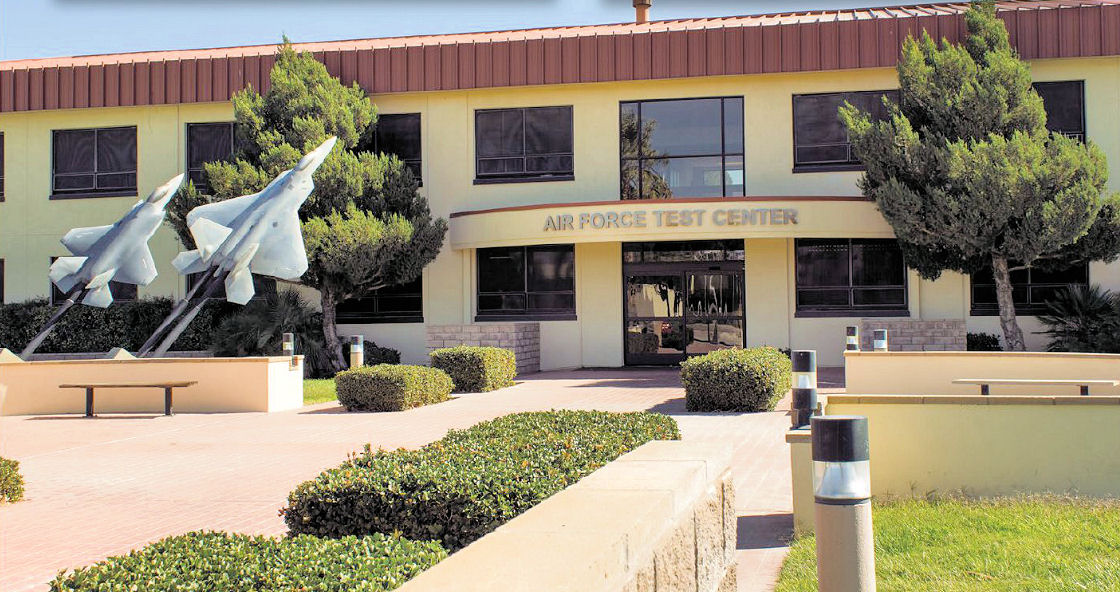
- Headquarters, Air Force Test Center, Edwards AFB, California
- Active: 25 June 1951 – Present
- Country: United States
- Branch: United States Air Force
- Role: Flight Test
- Part of: Air Force Materiel Command
- Garrison/HQ: Edwards Air Force Base
- Mottos: Ad Inexplorata "Toward the Unexplored"
- Website: www.aftc.af.mil

Commanders
- Current commander: Maj Gen Mark Massaro

Insignia
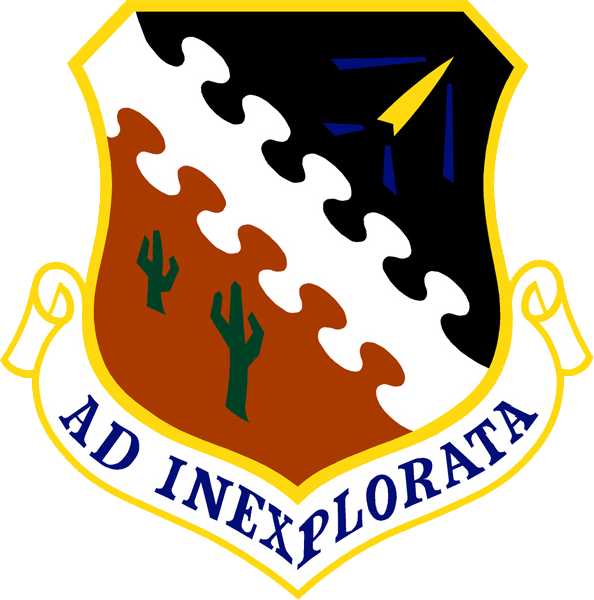
- Air Force Test Center emblem

The Air Force Test Center (AFTC) is a development and test organization of the United States Air Force. It conducts research, development, test, and evaluation of aerospace systems from concept to deployment. It has test flown every aircraft in the Army Air Force's and the Air Force's inventory since World War II. The center employs nearly 13,000 people, and controls the second largest base in the Air Force.

On 6 July 2012, the previous Air Force Flight Test Center (AFFTC) was redesignated as the Air Force Test Center (AFTC). Up until July 2012, the AFTC consisted of two subordinate wings. The 95th Air Base Wing (95 ABW) provided installation support for all units on Edwards Air Force Base while the 412th Test Wing (412 TW) conducted aircraft testing and evaluation at Edwards. In July 2012, the redesignated 96th Test Wing (96 TW), an amalgamation of the former 96th Air Base Wing, the former 46th Test Wing and the former Air Armament Center at Eglin Air Force Base, Florida, and the Arnold Engineering Development Complex at Arnold Air Force Base, Tennessee, also came under control of the AFTC.

== Overview ==
The Air Force Test Center (AFTC) conducts developmental and follow-on testing and evaluation of manned and unmanned aircraft and related avionics, flight-control, and weapon systems. AFTC also operates the U.S. Air Force Test Pilot School, which trains test pilots, flight-test engineers, and flight-test navigators.

The center has tested all the aircraft types in the Air Force inventory, and the center's workforce—civilian, military and contractor—work together to flight test and evaluate new aircraft and upgrades to aircraft already in inventory for Air Force units, the Department of Defense, NASA and other government agencies. Upgrades to be tested here include improvements to radar, weapons-delivery and navigation systems, and a system to give tactical pilots the ability to strike ground targets from low altitudes at night and in adverse weather.

The Air Force Test Center develops, operates and maintains the Edwards Flight Test Range and Utah Test and Training Range. It also operates the U.S. Air Force Test Pilot School. The center provides test infrastructure, overhead support for development, and operational test and evaluation support for aerospace research vehicles. AFFTC resources include the test and evaluation mission simulator, the Benefield Anechoic Chamber, Ridley Mission Control, and the Integration Facility for Avionics Systems Testing.

Ongoing research projects include the Lockheed Martin X-56 (UAV).

=== Air Force Flight Test Museum ===
The Air Force Flight Test Museum is open to military personnel with credentials to enter the base as well as general public tours offered periodically. The museum also features 40 aircraft on display at the museum or the nearby Blackbird Airpark in Palmdale, California. The museum also features aircraft engines, missiles, hardware, life support equipment, technical drawings, test reports memorabilia, and models.

== History ==
=== World War II ===
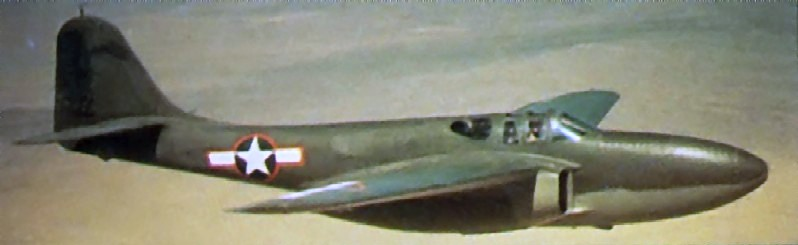
P-59A Airacomet with the short-lived red outlined National markings (June–September 1943).

Flight testing began at Muroc Army Air Base (later renamed Edwards Air Force Base) during World War II. It dates to 17 February 1942 when the 477th Base Headquarters and Air Base Squadron (Reduced) was moved from Wright Field, Ohio to the Muroc Bombing and Gunnery Range. Its mission was to test the secret Bell Aircraft XP-59A jet fighter. Muroc was chosen as it was a secluded site in the Mojave Desert out of the public eye. The first XP-59A aircraft arrived on 21 September 1942 for ground tests and it was fitted with a dummy propeller attached to its nose, just in case the curious might see it and start asking why this aircraft didn't have a propeller.

On 30 September, Bell's test pilot Robert Stanley was undergoing some high-speed taxiing trials with the XP-59A when the aircraft "inadvertently" became airborne for a short time, reaching an altitude of ten feet for one-half-mile during high speed taxi tests. However, the first official flight was on 1 October with NACA, Navy Bureau of Aeronautics, Royal Air Force, Army, Bell and General Electric personnel on hand.

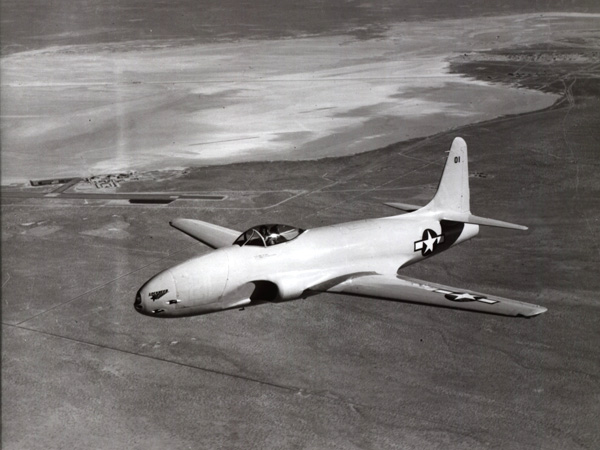
Lockheed XP-80A, AAF Ser. No. 44-83021, Gray Ghost in flight.

XP-59 aircraft testing continued at Muroc for the remainder of 1942 and in 1943. The second XP-59A flew on 15 February 1943 and the third late in April. Shortly before the first flight of the XP-59A, the USAAF had placed an order for one hundred P-59A Airacomets. However, the performance of the XP-59A service test aircraft had proved to be rather disappointing, not even up to the standards of conventional piston-engined fighter aircraft already in service with the USAAF. It was considered rather unlikely that any appreciable improvements in the performance of the P-59 would soon be forthcoming, and by the early fall of 1943 the Airacomet was no longer considered by the USAAF as being worthy of consideration as an operational combat type.

Most of the P-59s went to the Fourth Air Force 412th Fighter Group where they served in the training role. The Airacomets provided USAAF pilots and ground crews with valuable data about the difficulties and pitfalls involved in converting to jet aircraft. This information proved quite useful when more advanced jet fighters finally became available in quantity.

In the fall of 1944, Eighth Air Force tested its B-17 Flying Fortresses along with P-51D Mustangs against the XP-59 to see how well they stood up against the jet. The results were obvious. Also in October 1944, a small detachment arrived at Muroc for experimental work in rocket firing, remaining until the end of 1945.

Although the XP-59A provided valuable experience to the USAAF in the operation of jet-powered aircraft, it was basically a flying testbed and not a combat-capable aircraft. The USAAF had to look elsewhere in its search for an effective jet fighter. The first flight of the Lockheed XP-80 took place on 8 January 1944 with test pilot Milo Burcham at the controls. The XP-80 was eventually transferred to the 412th Fighter Group for tactical evaluation.

=== Postwar era ===
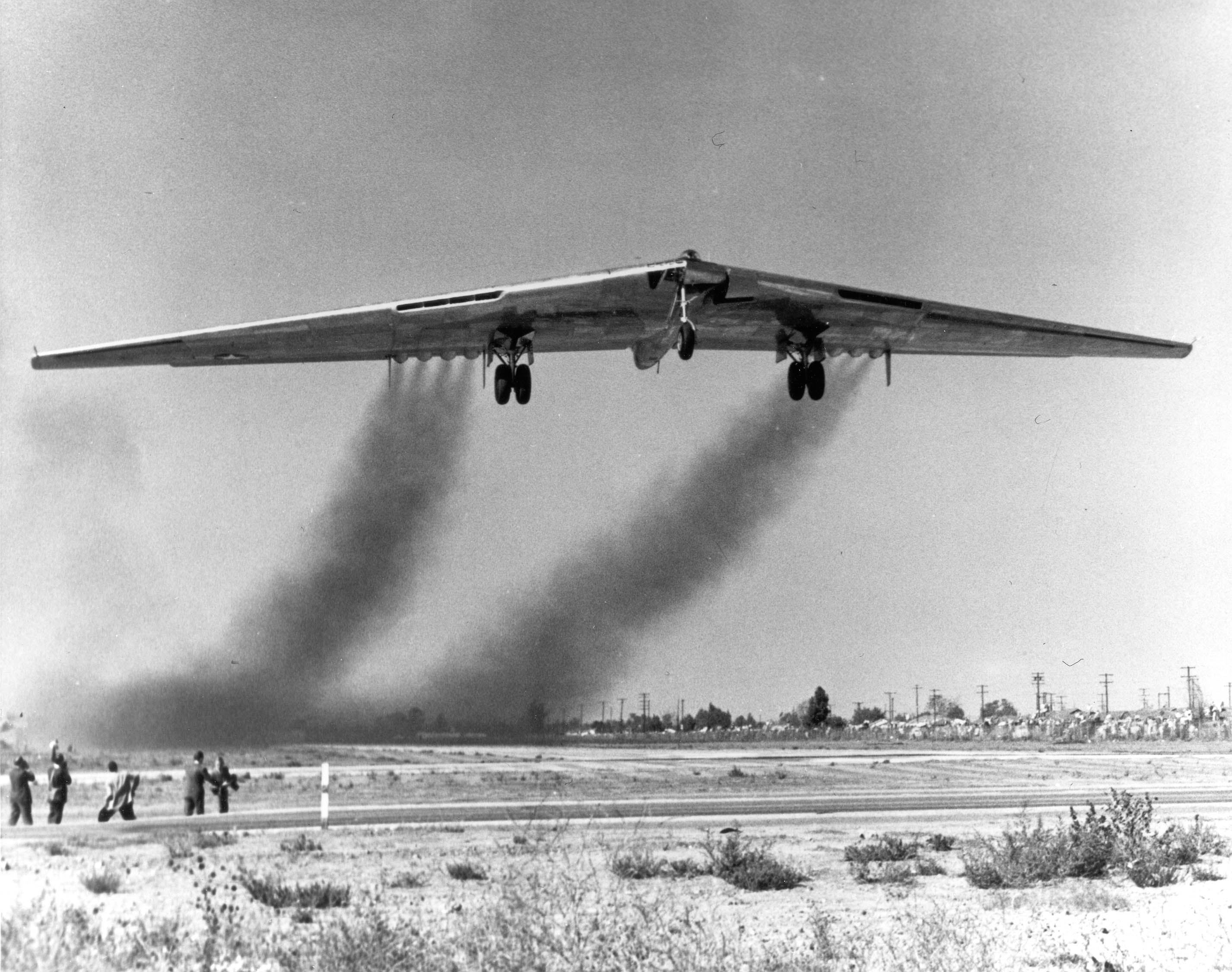
The Northrop YB-49 on a test flight, 1949

Following the war flight testing officially became the base's primary mission. Test work on the Lockheed P-80, the successor to the XP-59 was undertaken for the greater part of 1945. The Convair XP-81 and Republic XP-84 Thunderjet arrived at Muroc in 1946 for testing. It was clear by this time that the base's mission would be a proving ground for aircraft and a testing site for experimental aircraft.

On 14 October 1947, Captain Chuck Yeager, piloted the Bell X-1 to a speed of 760 miles per hour, breaking the sound barrier for the first time. In the years since, multiple generations of experimental "X-Planes" have been tested and flown at Edwards, for the Air Force and other agencies, such as NASA. Simultaneously, the base was hosting testing for proposed weapon systems including the F-84 Thunderjet, F-86 Sabre, F-94 Starfire, and B-45 Tornado.

The first Northrop XB-35 Flying Wing (serial number 42-13603) took off on its maiden flight on 25 June 1946, with Max Stanley as pilot and Dale Schroeder as flight engineer. On this first flight, the aircraft was flown from Hawthorne to Muroc, a flight lasting 45 minutes. The propeller-driven XB-35 however, was considered outdated and it was replaced by the jet-powered YB-49 on 21 October 1947 from the Northrop Field at Hawthorne, California, piloted by Northrop's chief test pilot, Max Stanley. At the end of the flight, it landed at Muroc Air Force Base where it was to carry out its test program. On the morning of 5 June 1948, XB-49 42-102368 crashed just north of Muroc Dry Lake. The pilot, Air Force Capt. Glenn Edwards, and all four other members of the crew were killed. In 1951 Muroc AFB was re-designated Edwards Air Force Base in his honor.

=== Air Force Flight Test Center ===
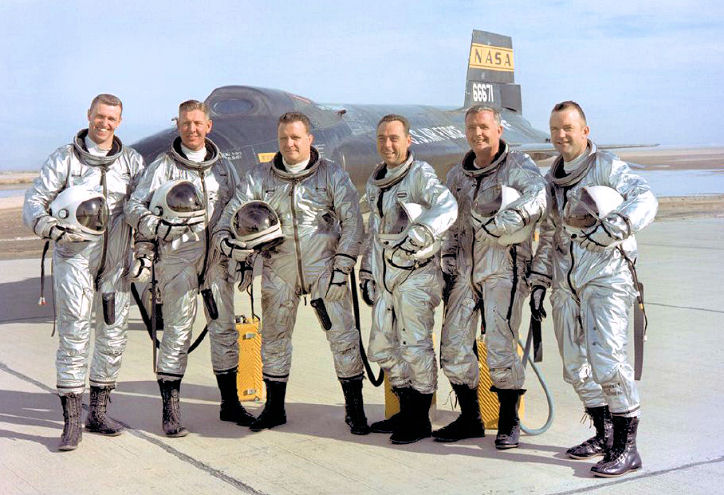
North American X-15A, AF Ser. No. 56-6671, with test pilots at Edwards AFB, California. 56-6671 was extensively damaged during an emergency landing at Edwards AFB on 9 November 1962 with John McKay at the controls. Later modified as an X-15A-2, it is now on display at the NMUSAF at Wright-Patterson AFB, Ohio.

With the transfer of Edwards AFB from Air Materiel Command to the newly created Air Research and Development Command, the postwar 2759th Experimental Wing was inactivated, being replaced by the Air Force Flight Test Center on 25 June 1951.

Technology pioneered through the AFTC led to remarkable advancements in aviation. The "Century Series" of aircraft, the F-100 Super Sabre; F-102 Delta Dagger, the Mach 2 F-104 Starfighter; F-105 Thunderchief and the F-106 Delta Dart made supersonic flight commonplace in combat aircraft. The Century Series fighters defined the basic speed and altitude envelopes for fighters that are still in effect today. Meanwhile, the aircraft of the X series continued to set speed and altitude records.

The 1960s ushered in the Space Age. The Test Pilot School was re-designated as the Aerospace Research Pilot School as it began to train future astronauts. The North American X-15 arrived and began to explore hypersonic and exoatmospheric flight. Major Robert "Bob" White became the first person to fly an aircraft into space on 17 July 1962 when he flew his X-15 to an altitude of 314,750 feet. Flying the same airframe a year later Joe Walker reached an altitude of 354,200 feet (67 miles). On 3 October 1967 William "Pete" Knight set the standing aircraft speed record of Mach 6.72 (4,520 mph), again flying an X-15. When the space program began a number of astronauts were selected from the Air Force's test pilot cadre. Additionally, the AFTC assisted with the testing of rocket engines and re-entry vehicles.

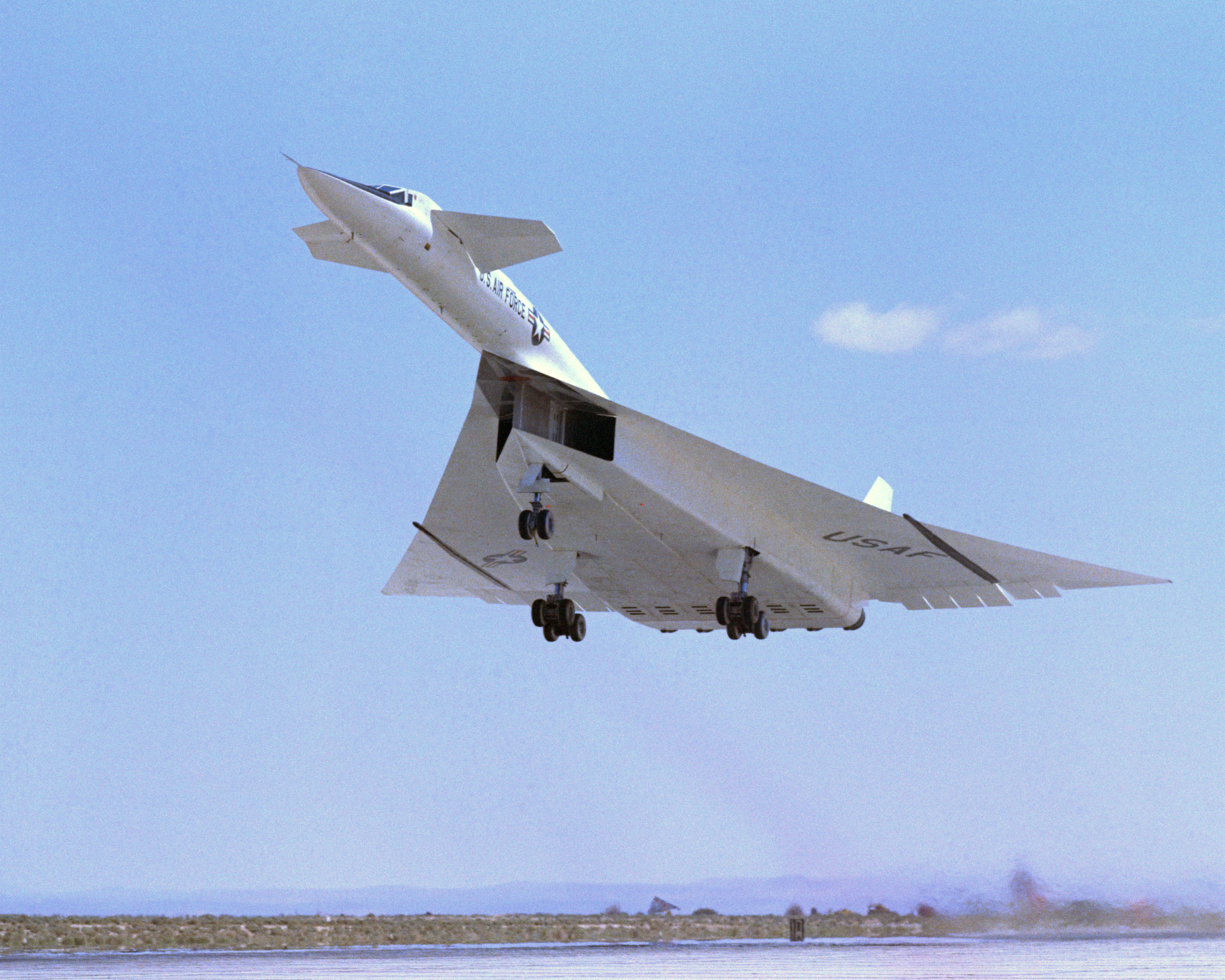
XB-70A Valkyrie on takeoff

Along with the X-15, pilots at Edwards were expanding the frontiers of atmospheric flight, testing the XB-70 Valkyrie high-altitude bomber, along with the YF-12 interceptor for Air Defense Command and the SR-71 Blackbird Strategic Reconnaissance aircraft for Strategic Air Command.

With the decline of the military crewed space mission after the NASA Lunar Landing Program ended, the Aerospace Research Pilot School was once again re-designated as the USAF Test Pilot School. The school replaced its space-oriented curriculum with an entire new battery of courses focusing on systems and test management. New aircraft arrived in the 1970s with the McDonnell F-15 Eagle. Two major "fly-offs" were conducted, one between the Northrop YA-9 and the Fairchild Republic YA-10, the other between the Northrop YF-17 and General Dynamics YF-16. The Rockwell B-1 Lancer began flight testing in 1974 with its multitude of highly sophisticated offensive and defensive systems.

In April 1981, the wheels of Space Shuttle Columbia touched down on Rogers Dry Lakebed, with Astronauts John Young and Robert Crippin successfully landing the first orbiting space vehicle ever to leave the Earth under rocket power and return to Earth aerodynamically for re-use. The "Flying Wing" returned to Edwards in the late 1980s when the B-2 Spirit stealth bomber began testing, and at a remote site, the F-117A Nighthawk stealth fighter. Air-Launched Cruise Missile, and LANTIRN systems were also tested during the 1980s.

The 1990s saw the arrival of the Lockheed YF-22 and the Northrop YF-23 prototype fighters, both using stealth technology and designed for air supremacy with agility, high-speed and supersonic cruise capability. Global Hawk, an unmanned aerial vehicle (UAV) was tested that has subsequently been used extensively for high-level reconnaissance in the skies of Afghanistan and Iraq began testing in February 1998.

In August 1998, Jane's Defence Weekly wrote that the most notorious restricted area within the Nellis Range complex was R-4808E surrounding Groom Dry Lake. The base is well-known as the birthplace of the U-2, A-12, SR-71, Tacit Blue, and F-117, and was under the airspace direction of "Dreamland Control." Jane's wrote in August 1998 that "..recent evidence indicates that the base is managed by E G and G Special Projects in Los Vegas and is actually Detachment 3 of the Air Force Flight Test Centre [headquartered at Edwards] and comes under the control of Air Force Materiel Command."

The MQ-1 Predator and MQ-9 Reaper attack UAVs, tested at Edwards, saw extensive service during the War in Afghanistan (2001-2021) and the Iraq War (U.S. phase, 2003-2010) as well as in drone strikes in the Pakistani borderlands and U.S. operations in and around Somalia.

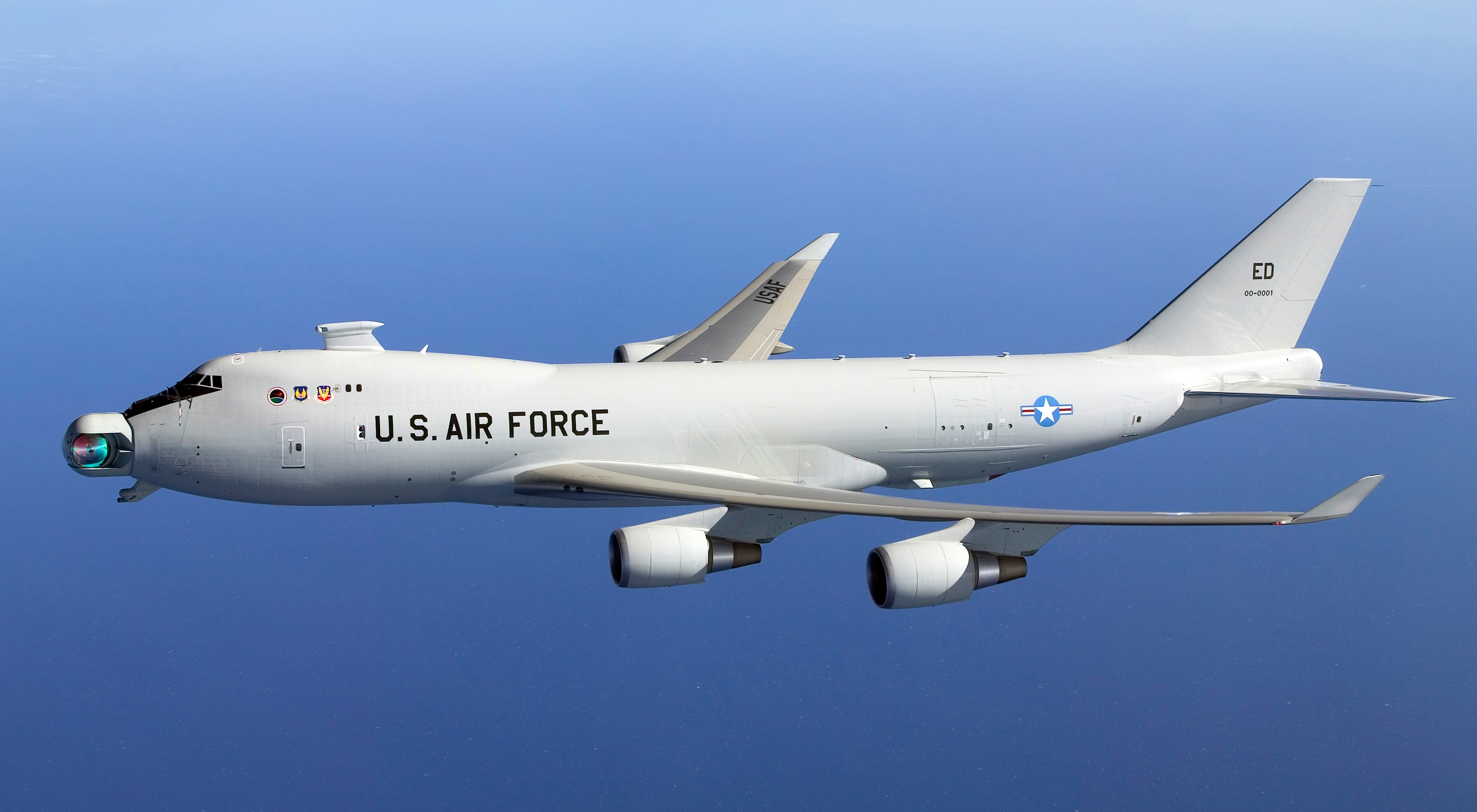
YAL-1A Airborne Laser undergoing flight testing.

More recently the AFTC was part of ASM-135 ASAT anti-satellite missile and Joint Direct Attack Munition development. The center played a key role in the development of the Air Force's X-35A and X-32A prototypes for the Joint Strike Fighter program, both making their first flights in late 2000. The resulting F-35 Lightning II is being built in three versions for the Air Force, the United States Navy and the United States Marine Corps, as well as multiple allied military partners. NASA maintains its Armstrong Flight Research Center on Edwards and partners with the AFFTC on aircraft development.

Effective 6 July 2012, the Air Force Flight Test Center was redesignated the Air Force Test Center, part of a new five-center AFMC construct. The new name reflects AFTC's expanded mission which includes Eglin AFB and Arnold AFB as well as flight test activities at Edwards.

== Units in 2012 ==
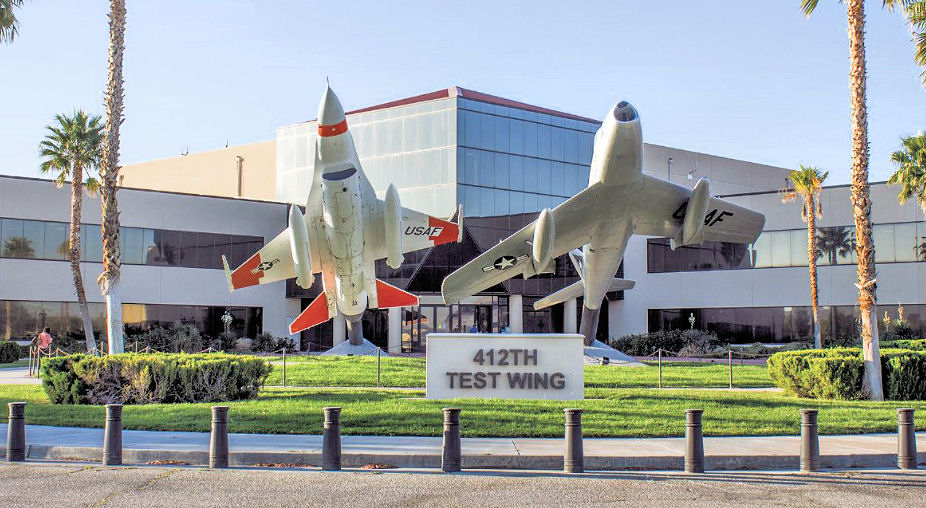
Headquarters, 412th Test Wing

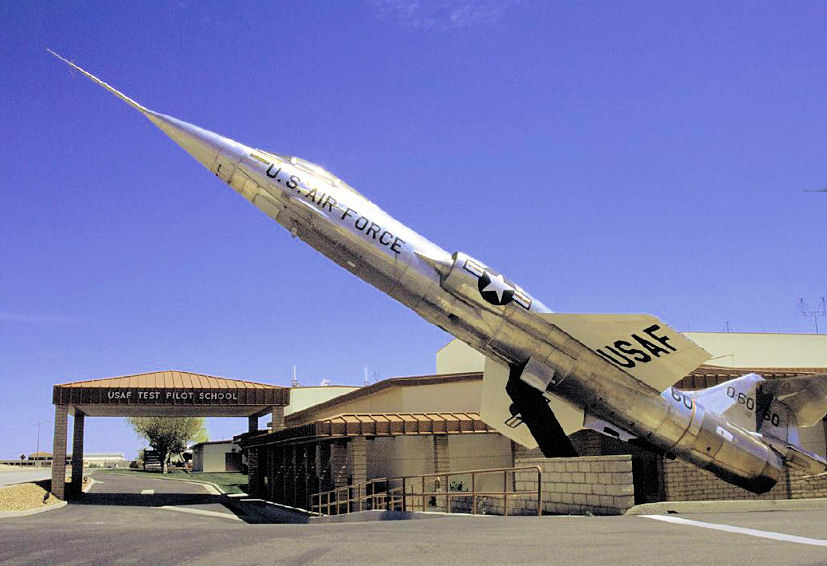
Headquarters, USAF Test Pilot School.

- 412th Test Wing (Tail Code: ED)

The 412th Test Wing plans, conducts, analyzes, and reports on all flight and ground testing of aircraft, weapons systems, software and components as well as modeling and simulation for the U.S. Air Force. The Wing also oversees the base's day-to-day operations and provides support for military, federal civilian, and contract personnel assigned to Edwards AFB.

412th Operations Group.
There are eight flight test squadrons under the 412th Operations Group with as many as 20 aircraft assigned to each. The 412 OG flies an average of 90 aircraft with upwards of 30 different aircraft designs. It also performs more than 7,400 missions (including more than 1,900 test missions) on an annual basis. The aircraft are grouped by mission

Global Power (fighters and bombers)

411th Flight Test Squadron: (F-22)
416th Flight Test Squadron: (F-16)
419th Flight Test Squadron: (B-52H, B-1, B-2)
445th Flight Test Squadron: (Initial Flight Test Operations, T-38)
461st Flight Test Squadron: (F-35 Joint Strike Fighter)

Global Reach (transport and air refueling)

412th Flight Test Squadron: (C-135C Speckled Trout)
418th Flight Test Squadron: (C-130 and special operations and special mission variants; CV-22; KC-135 and special variants; C-17A)

Global Vigilance (unmanned)

452d Flight Test Squadron: (RQ-4)

412th Test Management Division
412th Test Management Group
412th Electronic Warfare Group
412th Engineering Division

The Engineering Division and the Electronic Warfare Group provide the central components in conducting the Test and Evaluation mission of the 412 TW. They provide the tools, talent and equipment for the core disciplines of aircraft structures, propulsion, avionics and electronic warfare evaluation of the latest weapon system technologies. They also host the core facilities that enable flight test and ground test—the Range Division, Benefield Anechoic Facility, Integrated Flight Avionics Systems Test Facility and the Air Force Electronic Warfare Evaluation Simulator. The Project and Resource Management Divisions provide the foundation for the successful program management of test missions.

412th Civil Engineer Division
412th Maintenance Group
412th Medical Group
412th Mission Support Group

- U.S. Air Force Test Pilot School (USAFTPS)

The USAF Test Pilot School, also part of the 412th Test Wing, is where select Air Force pilots, navigators/combat systems officers, and engineers learn how to conduct flight tests and generate the data needed to carry out test missions. A small number of Army Aviators and USN and USMC Naval Aviators and Naval Flight Officers also attend USAFTPS. Human lives and millions of dollars depend upon how carefully a test mission is planned and flown. The comprehensive curriculum of Test Pilot School is fundamental to the success of flight test and evaluation.

- Detachment 1, Air Force Test Center, United States Air Force Plant 42, Palmdale, California. Aircraft manufacturing facility.***

=== Lineage ===
- Established as 477th Base Headquarters and Air Base Squadron (Reduced), 17 February 1942

Disbanded on 11 March 1944

- Established as 730th Army Air Forces Base Unit (Flight Test), 11 March 1944

Re-designated: 4144th Army Air Forces Base Unit, 1 October 1946
Re-designated: 2759th Air Force Base Unit, 29 August 1948
Re-designated: 2759th Experimental Wing, 20 May 1949
Inactivated on 25 June 1951

- Established as Air Force Flight Test Center and organized on 25 June 1951.

Re-designated: Air Force Test Center on 6 July 2012

=== Assignments ===
- Army Air Forces Materiel Command, 17 February 1942
- Air Technical Service Command. 31 August 1944
- Air Materiel Command, 9 March 1946
- Research and Development Command on 23 January 1950
- Air Research and Development (later Air Force Systems) Command, 25 June 1951
- Air Force Materiel Command, 1 Jul 1992–Present

=== Major components ===
- 96th Test Wing
- 3077th Experimental Group, 20 May 1949 – 25 June 1951
- 6510th Air Base Wing, 25 June 1951 – 4 October 1954
- 6510th Air Base Group, 4 October 1954 – 1 March 1978
- 6512th Test Pilot Training Squadron, 1 September 1952 – 1 March 1961
- USAF Test Pilot School, 1 January 1953 – Present
- 6510th Test Group, 1 July 1959 – 25 October 1963
- 6512th Test Group, 1 July 1959

Re-Designated: 6512th Test Wing, 1 October 1969 – 1 January 1973

- Air Force Rocket Propulsion Laboratory, 25 October 1963 – Present
- 4200th Test and Evaluation Squadron, 1 January 1965 – 2 October 1992
- 18th Survival Squadron, 1 January 1967 – 30 June 1975
- 6510th Test Wing, 1 March 1978

Re-designated 412th Test Wing, 2 October 1992–Present

== List of commanders since 2012 ==
No.	Commander		Term		
No.	Portrait	Name	Took office	Left office	Term length
1	Arnold W. Bunch Jr.	Major General; Arnold W. Bunch Jr.	June 19, 2012	June 18, 2015	2 years, 364 days
2	David A. Harris	Major General; David A. Harris	June 18, 2015	August 3, 2018	3 years, 46 days
3	Christopher Azzano	Major General; Christopher Azzano	August 3, 2018	July 15, 2021	2 years, 346 days
4	Evan Dertien	Major General; Evan Dertien	July 15, 2021	July 30, 2024	3 years, 15 days
5	Scott A. Cain	Major General; Scott A. Cain	July 30, 2024	June 30, 2026	2 years, 95 days
5	Mark Massaro	Major General; Mark Massaro	June 30, 2026	Incumbent	125 days

== See also ==
- List of aerospace flight test centres
