= R. Scott Jobe =

U.S. Air Force general

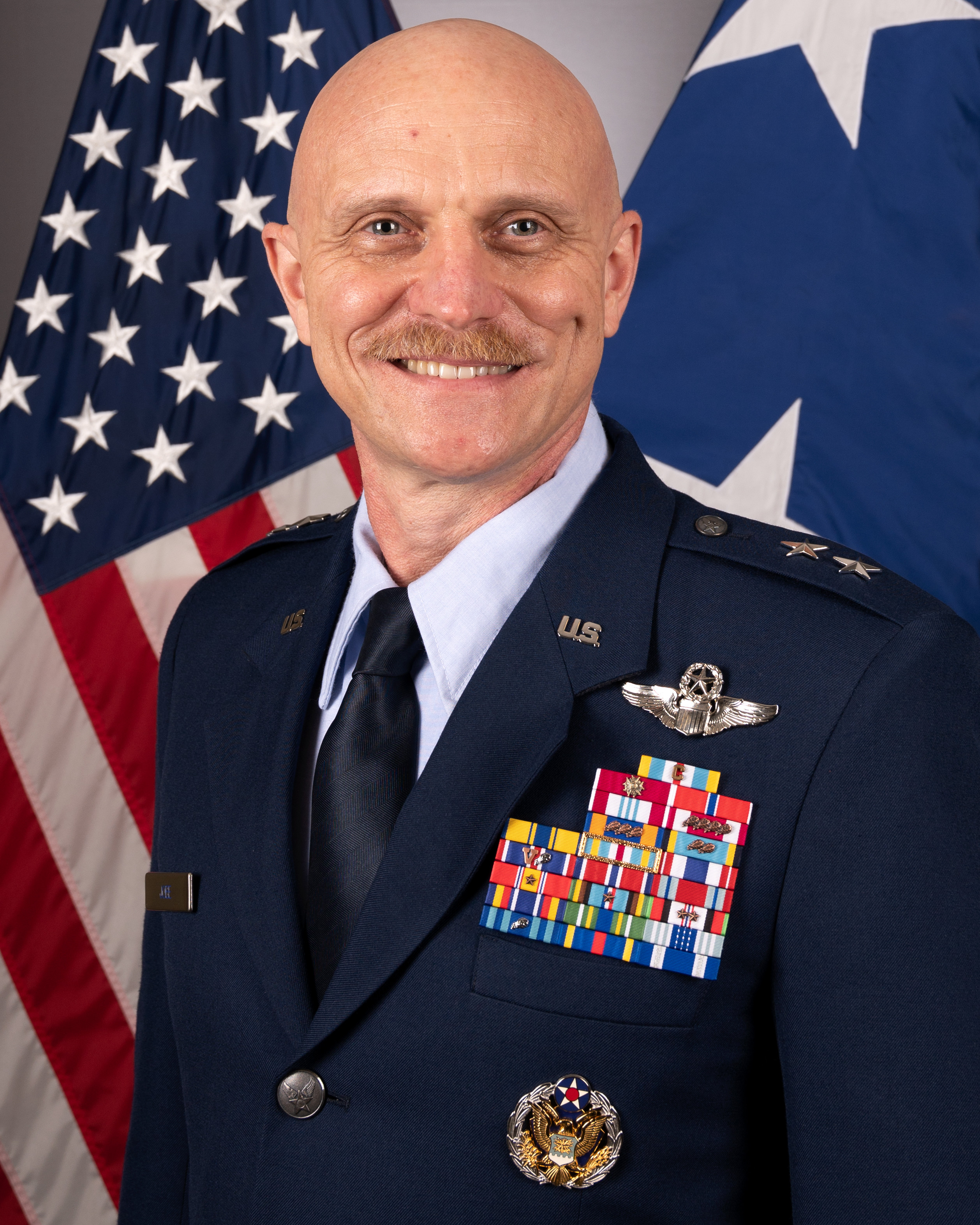
- Born: Robert Scott Jobe
- Military career
- Allegiance: United States
- Branch: United States Air Force
- Service years: Since 1993 (32 years)
- Rank: Major General
- Commands: 455th Air Expeditionary Wing; 35th Fighter Wing; 455th Expeditionary Operations Group; 16th Weapons Squadron
- Awards: Defense Distinguished Service Medal; Legion of Merit; Bronze Star Medal

Robert Scott Jobe is a United States Air Force major general who has served as the director of force design, integration, and innovation of the United States Air Force. He previously served as the director of plans, programs, and requirements of the Air Combat Command.

== Military career ==
In February 2021, Jobe was nominated for promotion to major general and assigned to become director of plans, programs, and requirements of the Air Combat Command, replacing Major General Case Cunningham.

Military offices
| Preceded by David B. Lyons | Commander of the 455th Air Expeditionary Wing; 2018–2019 | Succeeded by Derek O'Malley |
| Preceded by Heather L. Pringle | Director of Strategic Plans of the United States Air Force; 2020–2021 | Succeeded by Joseph D. Kunkel |
| Preceded by Case Cunningham | Director of Plans, Programs, and Requirements of the Air Combat Command; 2021–2023 | Succeeded by Christopher J. Niemi |
| Preceded by Daniel A. DeVoe | Director of Force Design, Integration, and Wargaming of the Air Combat Command; 2023–2024 | Succeeded by Joseph D. Kunkel |
