= Wendy M. Masiello =

United States general

Wendy Lee Motlong Masiello
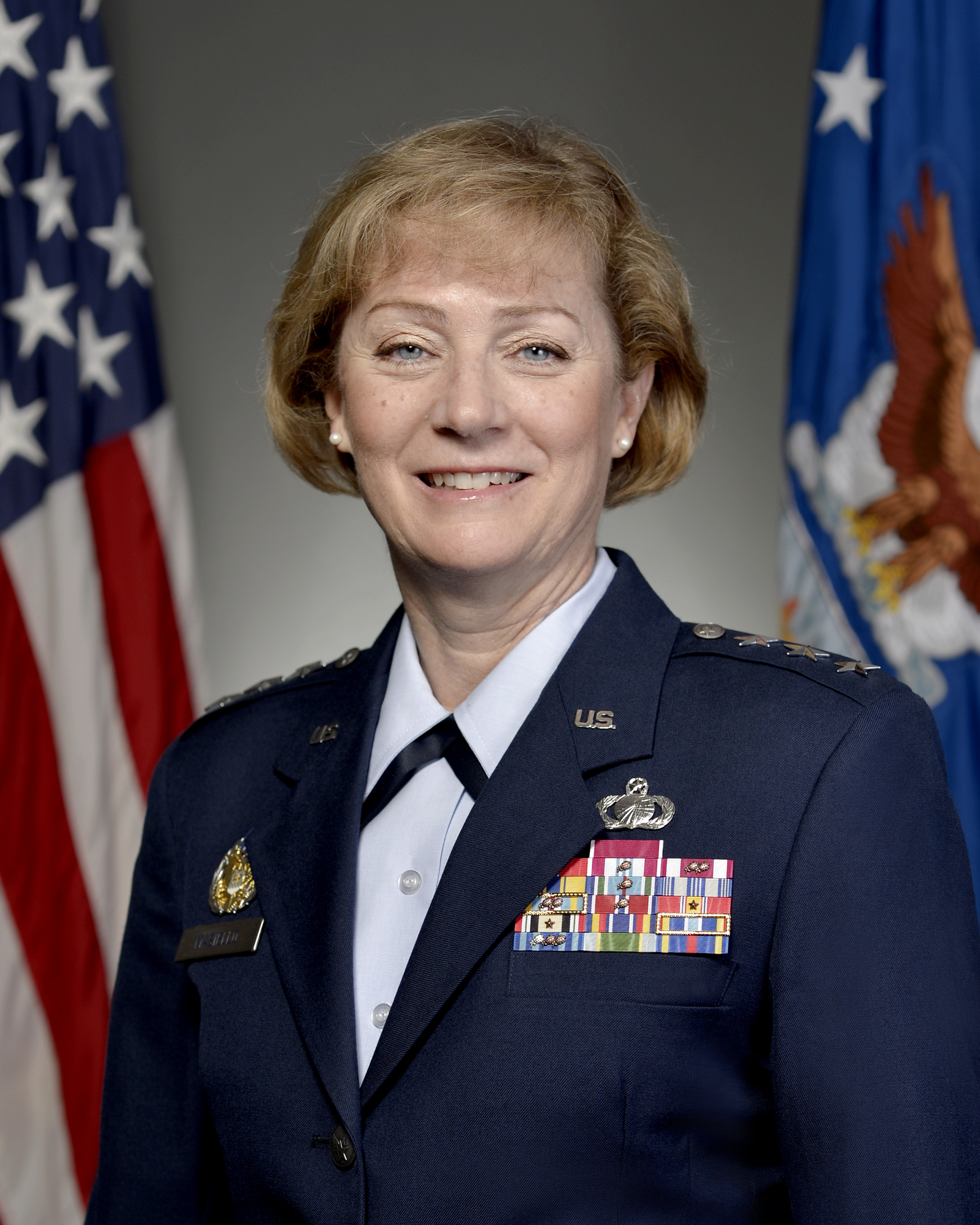
- Lieutenant General Wendy M. Masiello
- Born: 1958 (age 67–68); Lubbock, Texas, U.S.
- Alma mater: Texas Tech University (BBA)
- Relatives: Thomas J. Masiello (husband)
- Military career
- Allegiance: United States
- Branch: United States Air Force
- Service years: 1980–2017
- Rank: Lieutenant General
- Commands: Defense Contract Management Agency
- Awards: Legion of Merit; Bronze Star Medal; Defense Meritorious Service Medal (2); Meritorious Service Medal (3); Air Force Commendation Medal; Joint Service Achievement Medal (2); Air Force Achievement Medal; National Defense Service Medal (2); Iraq Campaign Medal; Global War on Terrorism Service Medal

Wendy Lee Motlong Masiello (born 1958 in Lubbock, Texas) retired as a lieutenant general in the United States Air Force on May 24, 2017. From May 2014 to May 24, 2017, she was the director of the Defense Contract Management Agency, based in Fort Lee, Virginia.

== Biography ==
Masiello is a 1976 graduate of Lubbock's Monterey High School, where she was a member of the University Interscholastic League Mathematics Team and the National Honor Society and treasurer of the French Club. Masiello is a 1980 marketing alumna of Texas Tech University's Rawls College of Business. She received her commission from Texas Tech's Reserve Officers Training Corps (ROTC) at time of graduation. Her involvement with the Air Force had begun earlier as a member of Angel Flight, a student organization which supported Air Force ROTC at Texas Tech. In addition to training at various military schools, she obtained a Master of Science from Air Force Institute of Technology at Ohio's Wright-Patterson Air Force Base in 1984 and a second Master of Science from National Defense University in 1999.

Masiello has held a variety of systems acquisition roles, including principal contracting officer for surveillance and reconnaissance systems, weapon systems and test ranges. She was an assistant professor at the Air Force Institute of Technology and executive director for the National Reconnaissance Office inspector general. She has also served several staff, tours, including deputy director of plans and programs, and director of contracting at two systems acquisition centers.

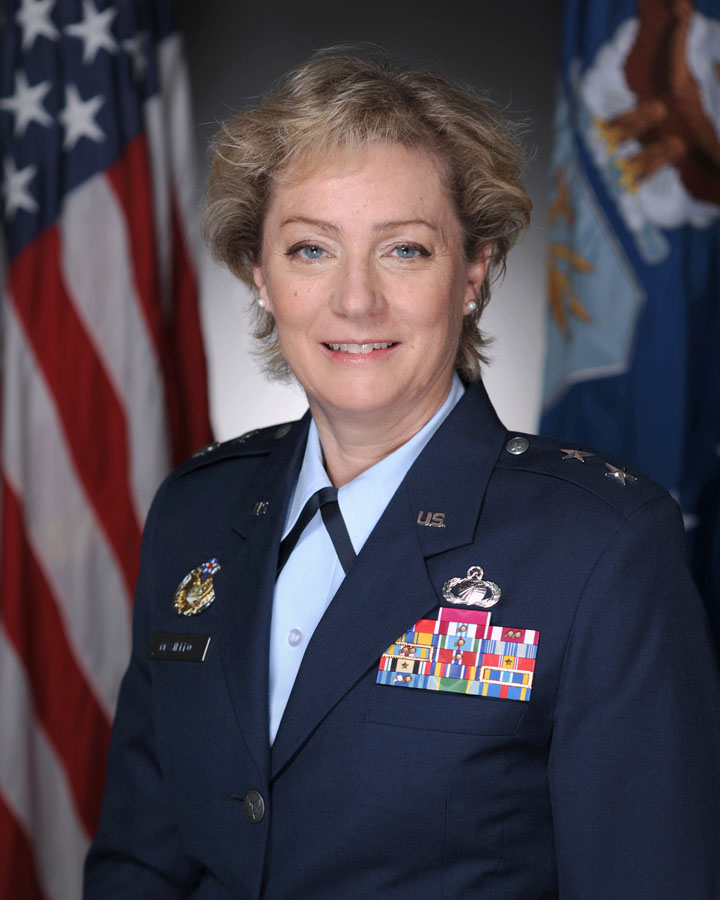
Masiello on occasion of her promotion to major general (two stars)

Masiello commanded the 95th Air Base Wing, and from July 2005 through January 2006, she deployed to Iraq as principal assistant for contracting forces in Iraq/Afghanistan. Her responsibilities included contracting and acquisition support to forces in both countries, security transition support in Afghanistan, and humanitarian relief following the Pakistani earthquake. Prior to her current assignment, she was program executive officer for combat and mission support.

Lieutenant General Wendy Masiello is married to Thomas Joseph "Tom" Masiello, a retired Air Force major general. The couple have two sons, who are also in the Air Force.

== Education ==
1980 Bachelor of Business Administration degree in marketing, Texas Tech University, Lubbock, Texas
1984 Master of Science degree in logistics management (contracting and manufacturing management), Air Force Institute of Technology, Wright-Patterson AFB, Ohio
1986 Distinguished graduate, Squadron Officer School, Maxwell AFB, Ala.
1993 Distinguished graduate, Air Command and Staff College, Maxwell AFB, Ala. 1995 Program Management Course, Defense Systems Management College, Fort Belvoir, Va.
1999 Distinguished graduate, Master of Science degree in national resource strategy, Industrial College of the Armed Forces, Fort Lesley J. McNair, Washington, D.C.
1999 Senior Acquisition Course, Industrial College of the Armed Forces, Fort Lesley J. McNair, Washington, D.C.
2007 Joint and Combined Warfighting School, Joint Forces Staff College, Norfolk, Va.

== Assignments ==
1. March 1981 – May 1983, procurement and production officer, Air Force Plant Representative Office, General Electric Space Systems Division, King of Prussia, Pa.
2. June 1983 – September 1984, student, Air Force Institute of Technology, Wright-Patterson AFB, Ohio
3. October 1984 – September 1987, instructor, Quantitative Contract Analysis, Air Force Institute of Technology, Wright-Patterson AFB, Ohio
4. October 1987 – September 1988, air staff training officer, Tactical Programs and Space and Strategic Defense Directorates, Office of the Secretary of the Air Force (Acquisition), Washington, D.C.
5. October 1988 – July 1992, deputy director of contracting branch, Office of Special Projects, Office of the Secretary of the Air Force, Los Angeles, Calif.
6. July 1992 – June 1993, student, Air Command and Staff College, Maxwell AFB, Ala.
7. July 1993 – September 1996, executive director, Office of Inspector General, National Reconnaissance Office, Chantilly, Va.
8. October 1996 – July 1997, deputy chief of Weapons, Air Base and Range Contracting Division, Air Base and Range Program Office, Eglin AFB, Fla.
9. August 1997 – July 1998, chief of Advanced Medium Range Air-to-Air Missile Contracting Division, Air-to-Air Joint Systems Program Office, Eglin AFB, Fla.
10. August 1998 – June 1999, student, Industrial College of the Armed Forces, Fort Lesley J. McNair, Washington, D.C.
11. July 1999 – October 2000, deputy director for plans and programs, Air Armament Center, Eglin AFB, Fla.
12. October 2000 – July 2002, director of contracting, Air Armament Center, Eglin AFB, Fla.
13. July 2002 – December 2002, vice commander of 95th Air Base Wing, Edwards AFB, Calif.
14. December 2002 – July 2004, commander of 95th Air Base Wing, Edwards AFB, Calif.
15. July 2004 – September 2006, director of contracting, Aeronautical Systems Center, Wright-Patterson AFB, Ohio (July 2005 – January 2006, principal assistant for contracting forces in Iraq/Afghanistan, Joint Contracting Command – Iraq/Afghanistan, Baghdad, Iraq)
16. September 2006 – August 2007, associate deputy assistant secretary (contracting), Office of the Assistant Secretary of the Air Force for Acquisition, Washington, D.C.
17. August 2007 – April 2011, program executive officer for combat and mission support, Office of the Assistant Secretary of the Air Force for Acquisition, Washington, D.C.
18. May 2011 – May 2014, deputy assistant secretary (contracting), Office of the Assistant Secretary of the Air Force for Acquisition, Washington, D.C.
19. May 2014 – May 2017, director of Defense Contract Management Agency

== Awards and decorations ==
Master Acquisition and Financial Management Badge
Headquarters Air Force Badge

Legion of Merit
Bronze Star Medal
Defense Meritorious Service Medal with bronze oak leaf cluster
Meritorious Service Medal with two bronze oak leaf clusters
Air Force Commendation Medal
Joint Service Achievement Medal with bronze oak leaf cluster
Air Force Achievement Medal
Joint Meritorious Unit Award with two bronze oak leaf clusters
Air Force Organizational Excellence Award with bronze oak leaf cluster
National Defense Service Medal with bronze service star
Iraq Campaign Medal with bronze campaign star
Global War on Terrorism Service Medal
Air Force Expeditionary Service Ribbon with gold frame
Air Force Longevity Service Award with silver and bronze oak leaf clusters
Small Arms Expert Marksmanship Ribbon
Air Force Training Ribbon

=== Other achievements ===
Leadership Award, Air Command and Staff College
2011 Federal 100 Award

== Effective dates of promotion ==
Promotions
Insignia	Rank	Date
	Lieutenant General	May 8, 2014
	Major General	December 17, 2010
	Brigadier General	November 27, 2007
	Colonel	May 1, 2002
	Lieutenant Colonel	January 1, 1997
	Major	April 1, 1993
	Captain	February 6, 1985
	First Lieutenant	February 6, 1983
	Second Lieutenant	February 6, 1981
