= Evan Dertien =

U.S. Air Force general

Evan C. Dertien
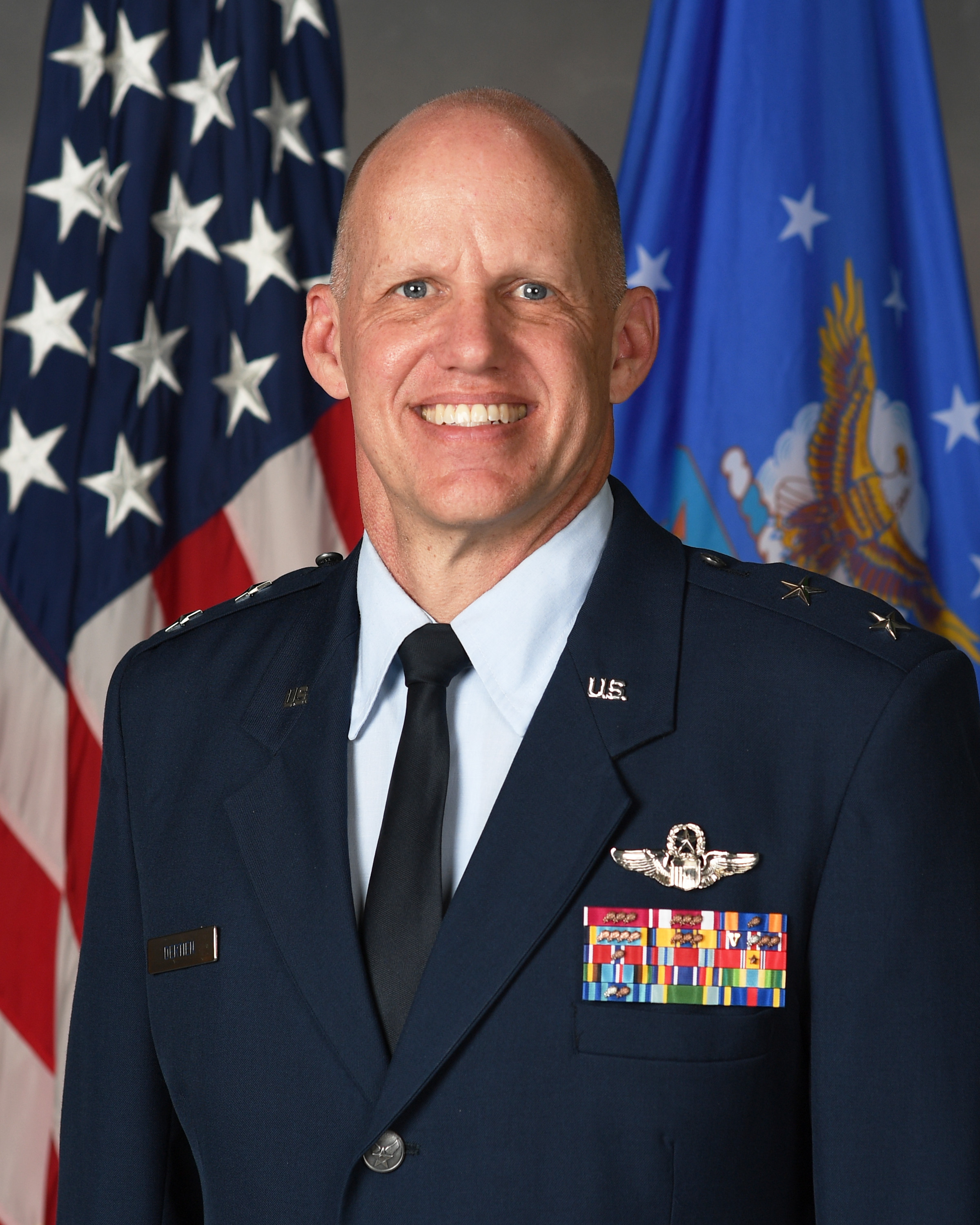
- Born: Colorado Springs, Colorado, U.S.
- Military career
- Allegiance: United States
- Branch: United States Air Force
- Service years: 1992–2024
- Rank: Major General
- Nickname: Weed
- Commands: Air Force Test Center; Air Force Research Laboratory; 96th Test Wing; 412th Test Wing; 40th Flight Test Squadron
- Awards: Legion of Merit (3)

Evan Carleton Dertien is a retired United States Air Force major general who served as the commander of the Air Force Test Center. He most recently served as the director for air, space, and cyberspace operations of the Air Force Materiel Command and prior to that served as the commander of the Air Force Research Laboratory. In February 2021, he was confirmed for promotion to major general and assigned to become the commander of the Air Force Test Center, replacing Maj Gen Christopher Azzano. He assumed his present assignment on July 15, 2021.

Military offices
Preceded by Christopher Azzano	Commander of the 96th Test Wing; 2017–2019	Succeeded by Scott A. Cain
Preceded by William T. Cooley	Commander of the Air Force Research Laboratory; 2020	Succeeded by Heather L. Pringle
Preceded by Kenneth Bibb	Director of Air, Space, and Cyberspace Operations of the Air Force Materiel Command; 2019–2020; 2020–2021	Succeeded by Russell D. Driggers
Preceded by Christopher Azzano	Commander of the Air Force Test Center; 2021–present	Succeeded by Scott A. Cain
