= Case Cunningham =

U.S. Air Force general officer

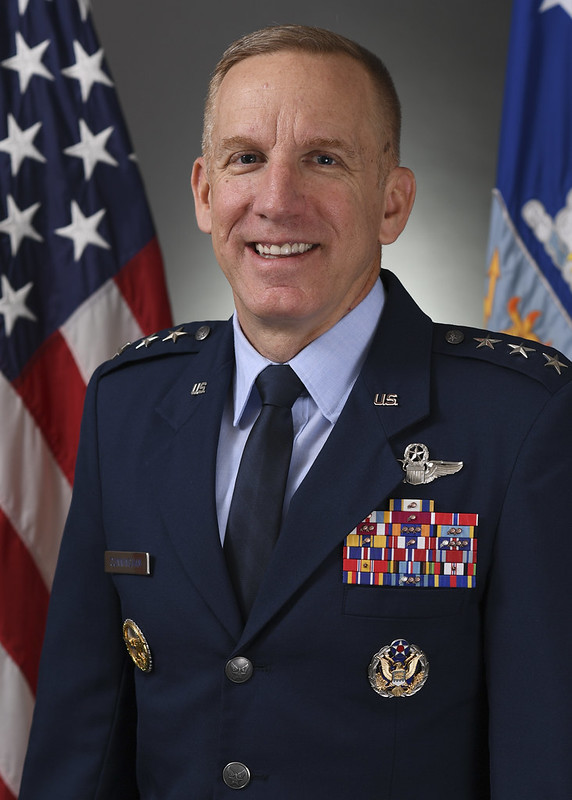
- Born: c. 1972 (age 53–54); Argyle, Texas, U.S.
- Military career
- Allegiance: United States
- Branch: United States Air Force
- Service years: 1994–present
- Rank: Lieutenant General
- Commands: Alaskan North American Aerospace Defense Region; Alaskan Command; Eleventh Air Force; United States Air Force Warfare Center; 18th Wing; 432nd Wing; 432nd Air Expeditionary Wing; USAF Air Demonstration Squadron
- Awards: Air Force Distinguished Service Medal; Defense Superior Service Medal (2); Legion of Merit (2); Bronze Star Medal

Case Andrews Cunningham (born c. 1971) is a United States Air Force lieutenant general who serves as the Deputy Chief of Staff for Operations of the United States Air Force. He previously served as commander of the Alaskan North American Aerospace Defense Region, Alaskan Command, and Eleventh Air Force, and as commander of the United States Air Force Warfare Center.

== Military career ==
Cunningham served as the director of plans, programs, and requirements of the Air Combat Command from 2020 to 2021.

In March 2024, Cunningham was nominated for promotion to lieutenant general and assignment as commander of the Alaskan Command, Eleventh Air Force, and Alaskan North American Aerospace Defense Region. In June 2025, he was nominated for reappointment as a lieutenant general and assignment as the deputy chief of staff for operations of the United States Air Force.

Military offices
Preceded by James R. Cluff	Commander of the 432nd Wing and the 432nd Air Expeditionary Wing; 2015–2017	Succeeded by Julian C. Cheater
Preceded by Barry Cornish	Commander of the 18th Wing; 2017–2019	Succeeded by Joel Carey
Preceded by Dagvin Anderson	Deputy Director for Operations of the United States Indo-Pacific Command; 2019–2020	Succeeded by David Shoemaker
Preceded by Patrick Doherty	Director of Plans, Programs, and Requirements of the Air Combat Command; 2020–2021	Succeeded by R. Scott Jobe
Preceded by Charles Corcoran	Commander of the United States Air Force Warfare Center; 2021–2024	Succeeded by Christopher J. Niemi
Preceded by David S. Nahom	Commander of the Alaskan North American Aerospace Defense Region, Alaskan Command, and Eleventh Air Force; 2024–2025	Succeeded by Robert D. Davis
Preceded by Adrian L. Spain	Deputy Chief of Staff for Operations of the United States Air Force; 2025-present	Incumbent
