= Christopher Azzano =

U.S. Air Force general

Christopher P. Azzano
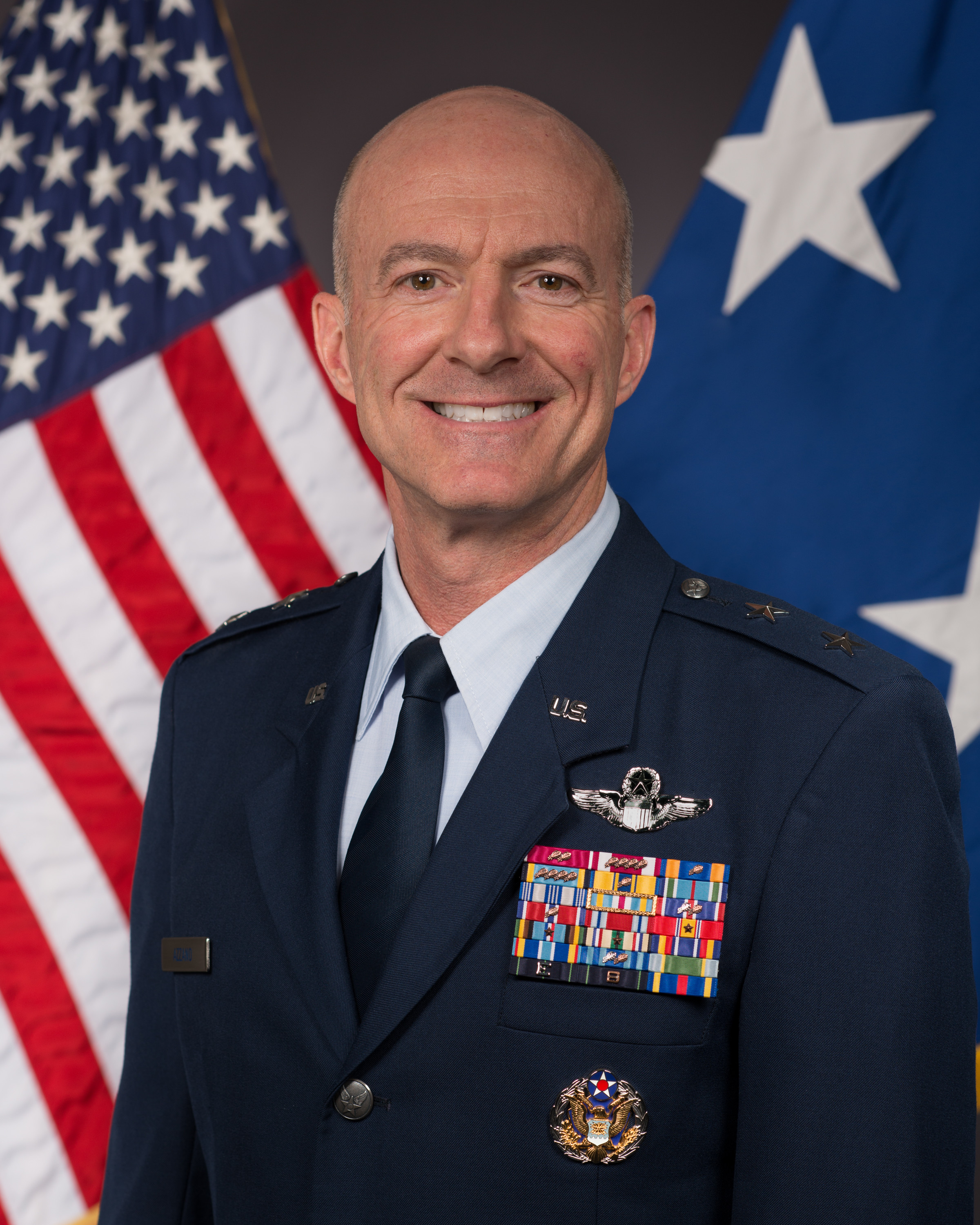
- Military career
- Allegiance: United States
- Branch: United States Air Force
- Service years: 1991–2021 (30 years)
- Rank: Major general
- Nickname: Pi
- Commands: Air Force Test Center; 96th Test Wing; 72nd Air Base Wing; 412th Operations Group
- Awards: Legion of Merit (3)

Christopher P. Azzano is a retired United States Air Force major general who last served as the commander of the Air Force Test Center. Previously, he was the director of air, space, and cyberspace operations of the Air Force Materiel Command.

He retired from active duty on July 16, 2021 (official retirement date is 1 October 2021) after relinquishing command of the Air Force Test Center to Evan C. Dertien the previous day.

== Dates of promotion ==
Insignia	Rank	Date
	Major general	July 3, 2019
	Brigadier general	Sept. 2, 2015
	Colonel	Sept. 1, 2010
	Lieutenant colonel	March 1, 2006
	Major	Feb. 1, 2002
	Captain	Feb. 13, 1995
	First lieutenant	Feb. 13, 1993
	Second lieutenant	Feb. 13, 1991

Military offices
Preceded by David A. Harris	Commander of the 96th Test Wing; 2015–2017	Succeeded by Evan Dertien
Preceded by Brian S. Robinson	Director of Air, Space, and Cyberspace Operations of the Air Force Materiel Command; 2017–2018	Succeeded by Kenneth Bibb
Preceded by David A. Harris	Commander of the Air Force Test Center; 2018–2021	Succeeded by Evan C. Dertien
