= Robert Hengehold =

American physicist

Robert L. Hengehold (born 18 June 1936) is an American physicist from the Air Force Institute of Technology. In 2009, he was awarded the status of Fellow in the American Physical Society, after they were nominated by their Forum on Industrial and Applied Physics in 2008.

Hengehold is the co-author of a textbook, An Introduction to Laser Weapon Systems, which was used as a resource in a short course offered by Air Force Institute of Technology (AFIT), in 2009. He served on the faculty of AFIT in 2009 after 40 years of service, including 25 years as head of the Engineering Physics department.

Hengehold is the author of more 100 archival publications and 200 presentations at technical meetings.

Among his many career accomplishments, he served as advisor on 17 doctoral dissertations and 80 Master’s thesis. He received the Air University Commander’s Award for Faculty Achievement in 1982, the Gage H. Crocker Outstanding Professional Achievement Award from the Affiliate Society Council of the Engineering and Science Foundation of Dayton in 1997, and the General Bernard A. Schriever Award for 1999.

== See also ==
- List of fellows of the American Physical Society (1998–2010)
