= Andrew B. Anderson Jr. =

United States Air Force general

Andrew Broadus Anderson, Jr.
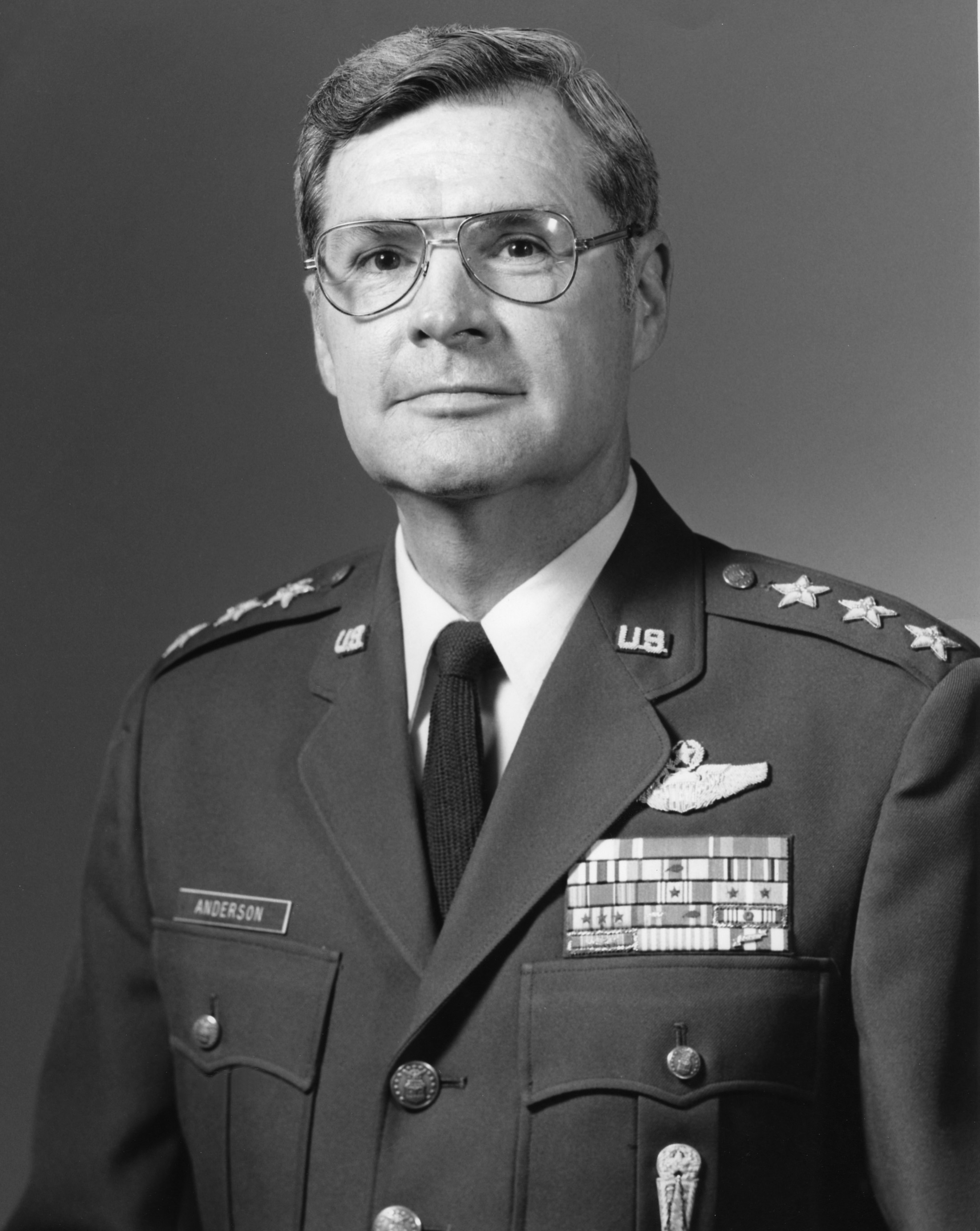
- Born: April 14, 1926; Rocky Mount, North Carolina
- Died: May 14, 2016 (aged 90); Wilmington, Delaware
- Military career
- Allegiance: United States of America
- Branch: United States Air Force
- Service years: 1949–1979
- Rank: Lieutenant general
- Commands: Chief of Staff, Strategic Air Command; Deputy Chief of Staff of the Air Force, Plans and Operations

Andrew Broadus Anderson Jr. (April 14, 1926 – May 14, 2016) was an American Air Force lieutenant general whose last assignment was deputy chief of staff, plans and operations, Headquarters U.S. Air Force.

== Biography ==
Anderson was born in Rocky Mount, North Carolina, in 1926. He graduated from the U.S. Military Academy at West Point, New York, in 1948 with a Bachelor of Science degree in military engineering and a commission as a second lieutenant. He attained a Bachelor of Science degree in aerospace engineering through the Air Force Institute of Technology in 1955 and a Master of Arts degree in history from the University of Nebraska in 1966. In October 1949, after pilot training, Anderson was assigned to the 8th Troop Carrier Squadron at McChord Air Force Base, Wash., as a pilot and assistant plans and training officer. In January 1952 he was transferred to the 14th Troop Carrier Squadron, Far East Air Forces. During the Korean War, he flew 540 combat hours.

Anderson returned to the United States in December 1952 and was assigned to Larson Air Force Base, Washington, first as an aircraft commander with the 53rd Troop Carrier Squadron and later as an operations staff officer with the 62nd Troop Carrier Wing. In August 1954 he entered the Air Force Institute of Technology's Engineering School. After completion of the course in September 1955, he was assigned to Hunter Air Force Base, Ga., as a B-47 aircraft maintenance officer with the 308th Bombardment Wing. In July 1956 he began a three-year tour of duty with the Directorate of Maintenance at Headquarters Strategic Air Command, Offutt Air Force Base, Nebraska. He was a maintenance analyst, maintenance plans and organization officer, and missile maintenance staff officer.

Anderson moved to Headquarters 15th Air Force, March Air Force Base, California, in June 1959, where he served as chief of Plans, Procedures, and Analysis Branch, Directorate of Maintenance. He returned to Headquarters Strategic Air Command in September 1962 and worked in the Directorate of Plans as a plans officer in the Space Branch, Future Systems Division. In August 1965 he entered the Industrial College of the Armed Forces, Fort McNair, Washington, D.C. Following graduation in June 1966, he joined the Strategic Plans and Policy Division, Organization of the Joint Chiefs of Staff, Washington, D.C.

Anderson was selected in August 1968 to be executive assistant to the military advisor to the personal representative of the president of the United States at the Paris Peace Talks on Vietnam. In this position, Anderson was top advisor to the senior United States military representative at the talks. He returned to the United States in May 1969 and was assigned as special assistant for joint matters, Office of the Director of the Joint Staff, Organization of the Joint Chiefs of Staff. In April 1970 he became vice commander, 93rd Bombardment Wing, Castle Air Force Base, California, and in October 1970 he assumed command of the 410th Bombardment Wing, K.I. Sawyer Air Force Base, Michigan. Anderson served as 2nd Air Force chief of staff from April 1971 through February 1973. From June 1, 1972, through January 15, 1973, while on this assignment, he also commanded the 57th Air Division (Provisional) at Andersen Air Force Base, Guam. Under his direction, this B-52 organization participated in the Southeast Asian conflict.

Anderson assumed duties as assistant deputy chief of staff, operations, Headquarters Strategic Air Command, in March 1973 and in January 1974 became director of operations plans, with additional duty as chief, Single Integrated Operational Plans Division, Joint Strategic Target Planning Staff. He was appointed chief of staff of Strategic Air Command in June 1975. In July 1976, Anderson assumed position as deputy chief of staff, plans and operations, Headquarters U.S. Air Force.

He is a command pilot and wears the Senior Missileman Badge. His military decorations and awards include the Distinguished Service Medal with oak leaf cluster, Legion of Merit, Air Medal, Joint Service Commendation Medal, and the Air Force Commendation Medal with oak leaf cluster. He was promoted to the grade of lieutenant general July 2, 1976, and retired on April 1, 1979. He died on May 14, 2016, in Wilmington, Delaware.
