= Thomas J. Masiello =

U.S. Air Force officer

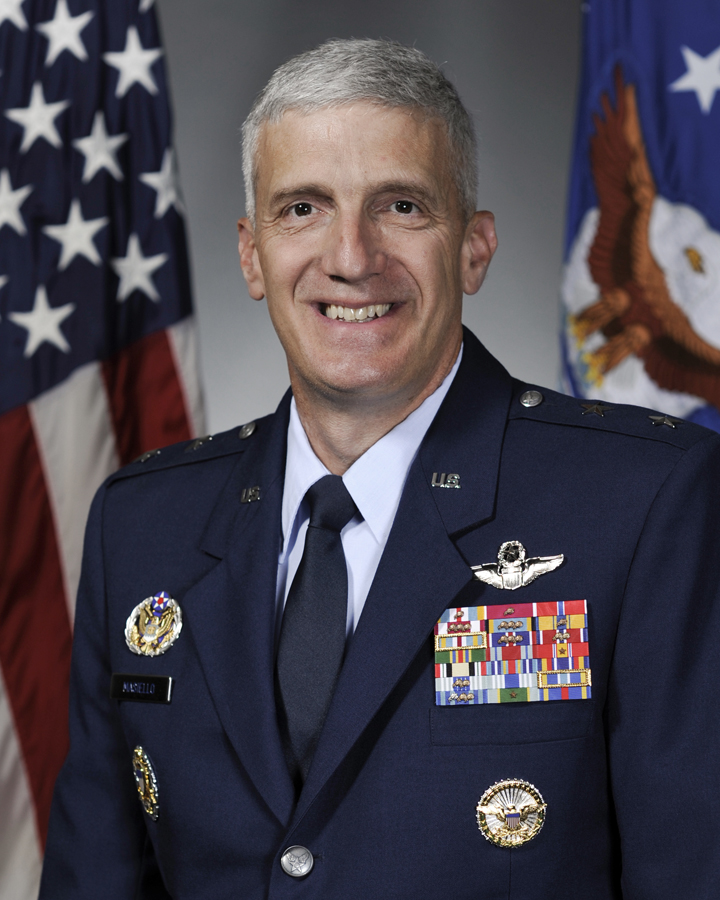
- Major General Thomas Joseph Masiello
- Born: Thomas Joseph Masiello
- Spouse: Wendy M. Masiello (wife)
- Military career
- Allegiance: United States of America
- Branch: United States Air Force
- Service years: 1981–2016
- Rank: Major General
- Nickname: "Tom"
- Commands: 40th Flight Test Squadron; Eglin Research Site (classified unit); Air Force Research Lab
- Awards: Defense Superior Service Medal (2); Legion of Merit (2); Bronze Star Medal; Meritorious Service Medal (4); Aerial Achievement Medal (4); Air Force Commendation Medal (2); Combat Readiness Medal; National Defense Service Medal (2); Iraq Campaign Medal; Global War on Terrorism Expeditionary Medal; Global War on Terrorism Service Medal

Thomas Joseph "Tom" Masiello is a retired United States Air Force Major General who served as the eighth commander of the US Air Force Research Laboratory. He is a member of the Society of Experimental Test Pilots.

== Career ==
Masiello was commissioned in 1981 as a distinguished graduate of the United States Air Force Academy. A command pilot, he has logged more than 3,300 flying hours in more than 20 different aircraft. He has served as an experimental test pilot and test squadron commander conducting developmental flight tests on a wide variety of weapon systems. He has been Director of the Munitions Directorate at the Air Force Research Laboratory, Wing Commander of a classified unit, and the Command Inspector General for Air Force Materiel Command.

Masiello has held other operational and staff assignments, including a tour as Deputy Chief of Staff, United States Central Command, where he spent the bulk of his tour at CENTCOM's Forward Headquarters in Southwest Asia; and Deputy Director for Operations — Operations Team Two, National Military Command Center, Joint Staff, The Pentagon, Washington, D.C. He has served as Deputy Director, Strategic Effects, U.S. Forces - Iraq, Baghdad, Iraq, and Deputy Assistant Secretary for Plans, Programs and Operations, Bureau of Political-Military Affairs, U.S. Department of State.

Major General Thomas Masiello is married to Wendy Lee Motlong Masiello, who is an Air Force Lieutenant General. The couple has two sons, who are also in the Air Force.

== Education ==
1981 Distinguished graduate, Bachelor of Science degree in electrical engineering, U.S. Air Force Academy, Colorado Springs, Colorado
1986 Distinguished graduate, Fighter Weapons Instructor Course, Nellis Air Force Base, Nevada
1987 Distinguished graduate, Squadron Officer School, Maxwell Air Force Base, Alabama
1990 Distinguished graduate, U.S. Air Force Test Pilot School, Edwards Air Force Base, California
1990 Master of Science degree in aeronautical science, Embry–Riddle Aeronautical University
1991 Distinguished graduate, Air Command and Staff College, Maxwell Air Force Base, Alabama
1995 Advanced Program Management Course, Defense Systems Management College, Fort Belvoir, Virginia
1999 Distinguished graduate, master's degree in national resource strategy, Industrial College of the Armed Forces, Fort Lesley J. McNair, Washington, D.C.
2005 General Management Program, Harvard Business School, Cambridge, Massachusetts
2007 Joint and Combined Warfighting School, Joint Forces Staff College, Norfolk, Virginia

== Assignments ==
1. June 1981 - May 1982, student, undergraduate pilot training, Williams Air Force Base, Arizona
2. April 1983 - September 1987, F-111F instructor pilot; Chief of Weapons and Tactics, 492d Tactical Fighter Squadron, Royal Air Force Lakenheath, England
3. October 1987 - December 1989, F-111 operational test and evaluation instructor pilot, 431st Test and Evaluation Squadron, McClellan Air Force Base, California
4. January 1990 - September 1990, student, USAF Test Pilot School, Edwards Air Force Base, California
5. October 1990 - July 1993, F-15A, F-15E and F-111 experimental test pilot, 3247th Test Squadron, and Flight Commander, 40th Flight Test Squadron, Eglin Air Force Base, Florida
6. August 1993 - June 1994, student, Air Command and Staff College, Maxwell Air Force Base, Alabama
7. July 1994 - August 1996, F-16 program element monitor, Deputy Chief of Staff for Plans and Programs, Headquarters U.S. Air Force, Washington, D.C.
8. September 1996 - July 1998, operations officer and F-16 experimental test pilot, 39th Flight Test Squadron, Eglin Air Force Base, Florida
9. August 1998 - June 1999, student, Industrial College of the Armed Forces, Fort Lesley J. McNair, Washington D.C.
10. July 1999 - June 2000, commander, 40th Flight Test Squadron, Eglin Air Force Base, Florida
11. July 2000 - May 2002, commander, Eglin Research Site, and Director, Munitions Directorate, Air Force Research Laboratory, Eglin Air Force Base, Florida
12. May 2002 - March 2004, Wing Commander, classified unit
13. March 2004 - July 2005, Command Inspector General, Air Force Materiel Command, Wright-Patterson Air Force Base, Ohio
14. July 2005 - June 2007, Deputy Chief of Staff, U.S. Central Command, MacDill Air Force Base, Florida (October 2005 - March 2006 and October 2006 - December 2006, Forward Headquarters, USCENTCOM, Southwest Asia)
15. June 2007 - January 2009, Deputy Director for Operations — Operations Team Two (J3), National Military Command Center, Joint Staff, the Pentagon, Washington, D.C.
16. January 2009 - January 2010, Deputy Director, Strategic Effects (CJ9), U.S. Forces-Iraq, Baghdad, Iraq
17. March 2010 - April 2011, Deputy Assistant Secretary for Plans, Programs and Operations, Bureau of Political-Military Affairs, U.S. Department of State, Washington, D.C.
18. May 2011 – July 2013, Director of Special Programs, Office of the Under Secretary of Defense for Acquisition, Technology and Logistics, the Pentagon, Washington, D.C.
19. August 2013 - May 2016, commander, Air Force Research Laboratory, Wright-Patterson Air Force Base, Ohio

== Flight information ==
Rating: Command pilot
Flight hours: 3,300
Aircraft flown: More than 20 different types including the F-15, F-15E, F-16, F-111, C-12 and HH-60

== Awards and decorations ==
U.S. Air Force Command Pilot Badge
Headquarters Air Force Badge
Joint Chiefs of Staff Badge
Office of the Secretary of Defense Identification Badge

Defense Superior Service Medal with bronze oak leaf cluster
Legion of Merit with bronze oak leaf cluster
Bronze Star Medal
Meritorious Service Medal with three bronze oak leaf clusters
Aerial Achievement Medal with three bronze oak leaf clusters
Air Force Commendation Medal with bronze oak leaf cluster
Joint Meritorious Unit Award
Air Force Outstanding Unit Award with three bronze oak leaf clusters
Air Force Organizational Excellence Award with two bronze oak leaf clusters
Navy Meritorious Unit Commendation
Combat Readiness Medal
National Defense Service Medal with bronze service star
Iraq Campaign Medal with bronze campaign star
Global War on Terrorism Expeditionary Medal
Global War on Terrorism Service Medal
Air Force Overseas Short Tour Service Ribbon with two bronze oak leaf clusters
Air Force Overseas Long Tour Service Ribbon
Air Force Expeditionary Service Ribbon with gold frame
Air Force Longevity Service Award with silver and two bronze oak leaf clusters
Small Arms Expert Marksmanship Ribbon with bronze service star
Air Force Training Ribbon

== Effective dates of promotion ==
Promotions
Insignia	Rank	Date
	Major General	June 3, 2011
	Brigadier General	August 3, 2007
	Colonel	April 1, 2001
	Lieutenant Colonel	January 1, 1997
	Major	September 1, 1993
	Captain	May 27, 1985
	First Lieutenant	May 27, 1983
	Second Lieutenant	May 27, 1981
