= Heather L. Pringle =

U.S. Air Force general

Heather Pringle
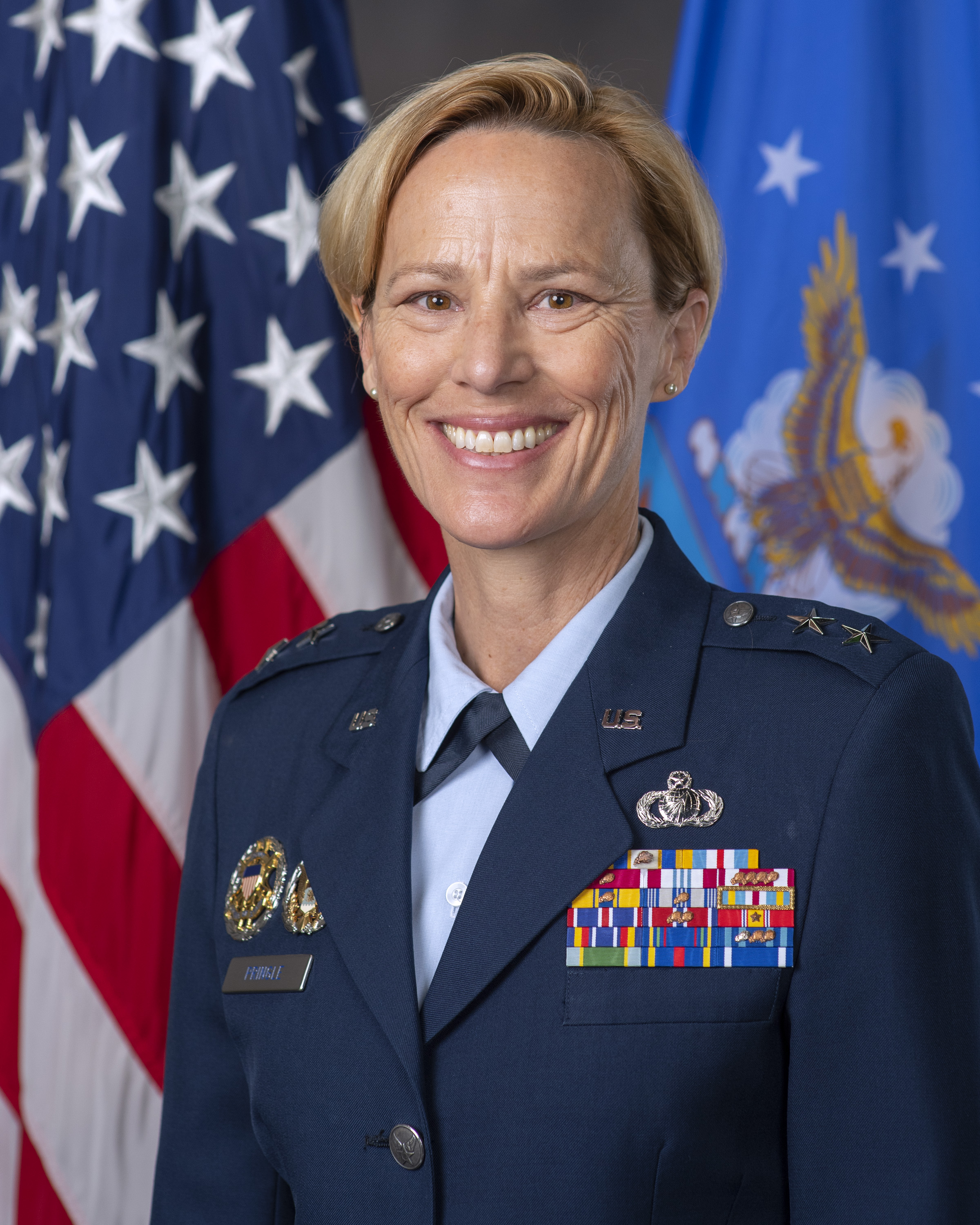
- Military career
- Allegiance: United States
- Branch: United States Air Force
- Service years: 1991–2023
- Rank: Major General
- Commands: Air Force Research Laboratory; 502nd Air Base Wing; 555th International Materiel Squadron
- Awards: Air Force Distinguished Service Medal; Defense Superior Service Medal; Legion of Merit (2)

Heather L. Pringle is a retired United States Air Force major general who last served as the commander of the Air Force Research Laboratory. She previously served as the director of strategic plans of the U.S. Air Force.

Pringle was hired to serve as the chief executive officer of Space Foundation.

Military offices
Preceded by Scott L. Pleus	Executive Officer of the Chief of Staff of the United States Air Force; 2014–2016	Succeeded by Matthew Wolfe Davidson
Preceded by Robert D. LaBrutta	Commander of the 502nd Air Base Wing; 2016–2018	Succeeded by Laura Lenderman
Preceded by Michael T. Brewer	Director of Strategic Plans, Programs, Requirements, and Analyses of the Air Force Materiel Command; 2018–2019	Succeeded by Donna D. Shipton
Preceded by David A. Krumm	Director of Strategic Plans of the United States Air Force; 2019–2020	Succeeded by R. Scott Jobe
Preceded by Evan Dertien	Commander of the Air Force Research Laboratory; 2020–2023	Succeeded by Scott A. Cain
