= Glen Edwards =

Glen Edwards may refer to:

- Glen Edwards (pilot) (1916–1948), U.S. Air Force test pilot
- Glen Edwards (safety) (born 1947), American football safety
- Glen "Turk" Edwards (1907–1973), American football tackle and coach, member of Pro Football Hall of Fame

== See also ==
- Glynn Edwards (1931–2018), English actor
