= Western Placer Unified School District =

School district in California

Address
- 600 6th Street, Suite 400 Lincoln, California, 95648; United States

District information
- Grades: K–12
- Superintendent: Kerry Callahan
- NCES District ID: 0642140

Students and staff
- Enrollment: 7,081 (2020–2021)
- Teachers: 306.78 (FTE)
- Staff: 295.73 (FTE)
- Student–teacher ratio: 23.08:1

Other information
- Website: www.wpusd.org

Western Placer Unified School District is a unified school district based in the Placer County city of Lincoln, California. The district is composed of seven elementary schools, two middle schools, and two high schools.

== Schools ==
=== High School ===
- Phoenix High School
- Lincoln High School
- Twelve Bridges High School

=== Middle School ===
- Glen Edwards Middle School
- Twelve Bridges Middle School

=== Elementary ===
- Carlin C. Coppin Elementary
- Creekside Oaks Elementary
- First Street Elementary
- Foskett Ranch Elementary
- Lincoln Crossing Elementary
- Sheridan Elementary
- Scott M. Leaman Elementary
- Twelve Bridges Elementary
