= Lincoln High School (Lincoln, California) =

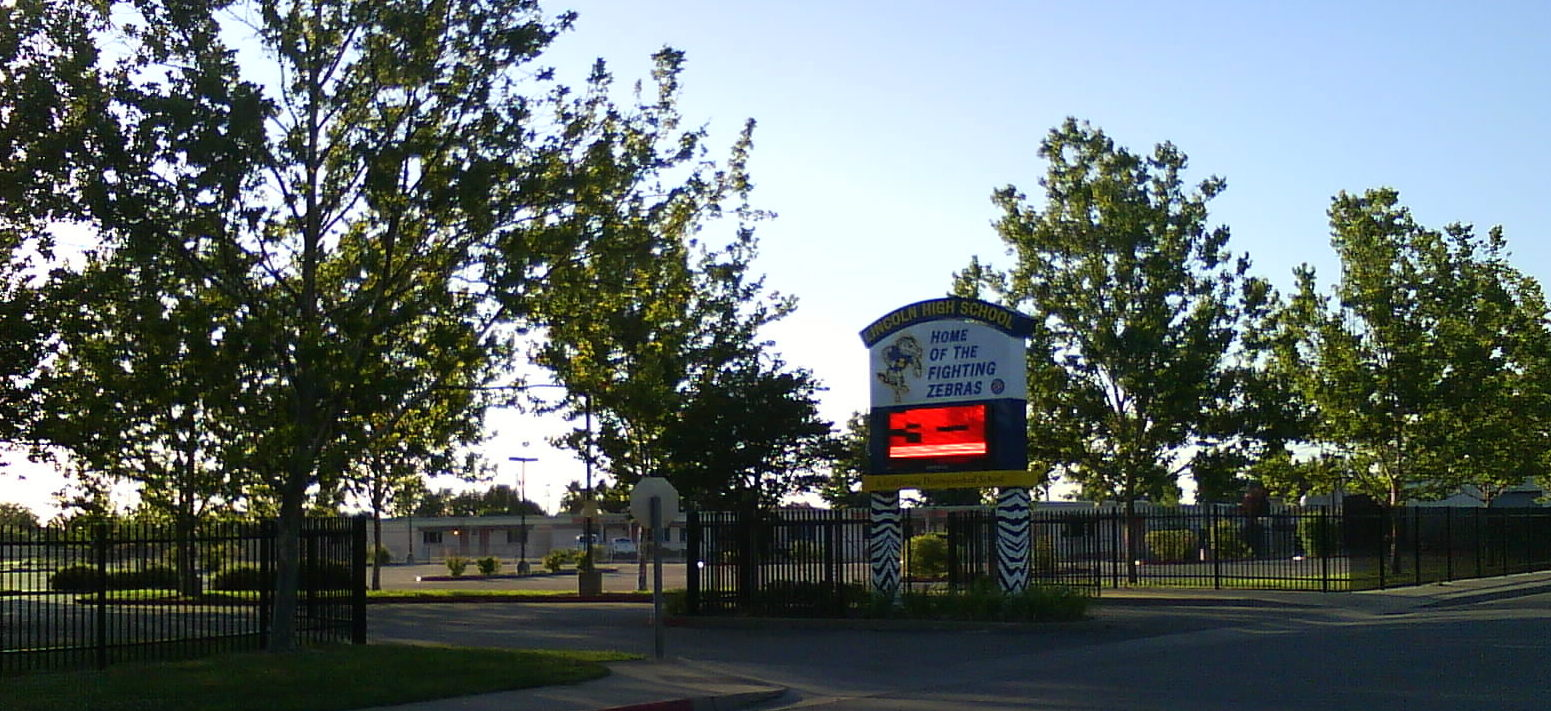
- "Home of the Fighting Zebras"

Location
- 790 J Street; Lincoln, Placer County, California 95648; United States; 38.89527°N 121.29819°W

Information
- School type: Public Secondary
- Opened: 1907
- School district: Western Placer Unified School District
- Superintendent: Kerry Callahan
- Faculty: About 100
- Teaching staff: 56.71 (FTE)
- Grades: 9–12
- Enrollment: 1,184 (2024–2025)
- Student to teacher ratio: 20.88
- Colors: Royal Blue, Athletic Gold
- Fight song: "On Wisconsin"
- Mascot: Fighting Zebras
- Rivals: Wheatland High School (California) Placer High School Whitney High School Del Oro High School
- Newspaper: Zebra Tales
- Yearbook: "El Eco" by Jostens
- Website: lhs.wpusd.org

Lincoln High School is a public high school located in the city of Lincoln, California. The school, which serves grades 9 through 12, is a part of the Western Placer Unified School District. It is one of two high schools in Lincoln, California and has its own working school farm - the largest working school farm west of the Mississippi river. The school finished construction of the Edward A. Grey Sports Complex in 2005, including a new stadium and baseball fields.

== Academics and activities ==
Lincoln High School's academic schedule is in the form of a two-day rotating block schedule. Four ninety-minute class periods are taken one day, with the other four classes being taken the next. Upperclassmen are allowed off the campus during lunch if they are in good standings with the school.

The athletic program at LHS is extensive, providing more than 20 sports.

Lincoln also has a wide range of clubs, including chapters of The National Honor Society, The Future Farmers of America, and The Fellowship of Christian Athletes, often having professional athletes come and speak for meetings. The Chess Club, Dance Club, Gay-Straight Alliance, Robotics Club, Cyber Patriots, Christian Club, Physics Club, Peer Tutoring, Knitting Club, HOSA (Health Occupation Students of America), Interact Key Club, and Debate Club are a few other well-ran extracurricular clubs at the school.

11 Advanced Placement and many more honors courses are offered, with more coming soon. AP Courses offered include Psychology, Biology, Physics, Chemistry, AB/BC Calculus, English Literature, English Language, Spanish Language, Music Theory, World History, U.S. History, and Government. All AP classes offer AP exams that can award students with up to 5 college credits.

Lincoln High School is 114 years old, thus having a rich history in Performing Arts and Music Education. Dance Classes, Theater and Drama, Marching Band, Symphonic Band, a Winter Color Guard program, and a traveled choir program are a few of the fine arts offered. Guitar, Piano and college level AP Music Theory are also taught by Music Directors David Hill and Cindy Hagman. In addition to this, there are several visual art classes, including ceramics.

There is an extensive pathway of engineering electives funded and instituted by Project Lead the Way, and an extensive pathway of electives in Medical Sciences, Technology, and Agriculture. There is also a wood shop class, a diesel class, a welding class, essentials of technology, media and communication, digital audio, weight training, and more.

Lincoln High School has updated its curriculum in keeping with the California Common Core Standards.

== Concert, Elite, and Select choirs ==
=== Choral Music Programs: Directed by Cindy Hagman ===
==== Concert Choir ====
The Lincoln High School Concert Choir is the entry level choir at Lincoln High School, as it is open for enrollment for 9th-12th graders. The average class size is around 50 students, Although there is no prior musical knowledge required, students enrolled in this choir class will learn how to sing rhythms as well as basic musical sight reading. The Concert Choir performs at least once a semester at the Winter and Spring Concerts, usually performing a variety of music.

==== Elite Choir ====
The Lincoln High School Elite Choir is an audition-only choir at the high school. Though it is open to all grades, the majority of this class consists of grades 10–12. This higher level choir consists of around 50-60 talented students. The Elite Choir has a well-developed presence throughout the town as well as worldwide, as the choir performs regularly around the surrounding neighborhoods, as well as taking yearly spring trips to scenic destinations. Notably, the Elite Choir traveled in June 2016 to Prague, Czech Republic; Vienna and Salzburg, Austria; and Munich, Germany and performed in the esteemed St. Stephen's Cathedral in Vienna. Previously, the Elite Choir performed at the well-known Carnegie Hall with multiple other choirs. During the 2016–2017 school year, the Elite Choir will be performing at a competition in Disneyland. Music that has been previously performed by the Elite Choir includes "Seal Lullaby" by Eric Whitacre, "Daniel, Daniel Servant of the Lord" arranged by Undine S. Moore, and "Shut De Do" by Randy Stonehill.

==== Select Choir ====
The Lincoln High School Select Choir consists of a handful of members only taken from the Elite Choir (usually section leaders) and performs throughout the community at fundraisers and other events. The Select Choir is known colloquially as the "Traveling Choir", as the members of this choir have been seen performing in groups of varying sizes at many events, at one point up to 8 in one week. The Select Choir meets for an hour or more every week, as this is not a class offered at Lincoln High School, but rather an extracurricular type activity.

== Music programs ==
The Lincoln High School Fighting Zebra Marching Band is a field band, parade band and color guard that participates in competitions throughout the Central Valley. The 2014–15 season saw about 85 members including two drum majors and 10 color guard. The 2013–14 season's show was "Mary Poppins", 2014-15 was "From the Darkness", and the 2015–16 season's show was "Anyway the Wind Blows", a compilation of Queen songs including the world-renowned "Bohemian Rhapsody". Competitions have been attended in Stockton and at Folsom, Del Oro, and Oakmont High Schools. The marching band has a large hometown presence, performing at every home football game and marching parades throughout the year. The marching band also functions as a pep band during football and basketball games, constantly filling the stands with enthusiasm, cheering, and playing pep tunes such as "Land of 1000 Dances", "Zarathustra", "Go Big Blue", "ABC" by The Jackson 5. Some pieces performed are arranged by the band members themselves. The Star Spangled Banner is played before each game's beginning, and the drum-line often plays cadences than cause spontaneous outbreaks of dancing.

Color guard enhances the visuals of the marching band. Rifle, saber, flag and ribbon techniques are taught to members of guard, and there is also a winter guard that's not affiliated with the marching band. Those who are not in marching band may join winter guard.

The band has a two-week, nine hour pre-season in July that teaches new musicians how to march and allows the band to learn the drill and music. Three days during the week prior are devoted to teaching new members the basics of marching. Weekly sectionals during the school year allow each instrument section to focus completely on their own music and to work on memorizing the show.

The Lincoln High School Concert Band takes over when Marching Season ends, and students are introduced to more challenging, traditional music. The concert band has about six concerts a year, including a Christmas concert in December, District Band Day (a concert with all of the bands in the Western Placer Unified School District) in mid-March, a solo/ensemble concert in April, concerts in February and May, and graduation in early June. The ensemble also performs on their spring trips to places like Disneyland, California Adventure, San Francisco and the Pacific Western Concert Band Festival at the University of the Pacific. Throughout the year the band performs at rallies and other sporting events.

Most recently, the band performed at the Pacific Western Concert Band Festival (hosted by Dr. Eric Hammer) and received a review clinic/conductor's adjudication, watched other bands perform, and attended special-interest classes like conducting, music therapy, afro-Cuban percussion, a campus tour, yoga, and others. To end the festival, UOP's wind ensemble performs, which inspires many of the attending musicians. The band next traveled to San Francisco to tour The California Academy of Sciences and Fisherman's Wharf.

Symphonic Band is a course for more advanced players in the music program. Music will meet the California Advanced Standards, and daily practice will be expected. In addition to their own concerts, Symphonic Band may compete in competitions and other events.

Lincoln High's Jazz Band is a daily zero-period class during Semester 2. Students are taught advanced improvisation and swing skills, and have many opportunities throughout the season for solos, duets, trios, and other arrangements. The jazz band performs three concerts a year, in addition to providing entertainment at local events and fundraisers. All members of the jazz band are in concert band or marching band.

== Controversies ==
On Tuesday, November 5, 2024, CTE teacher Kyle Morris was exposed on the social media platform TikTok for allegedly having inappropriate conversations with a supposed 15-year-old as a 31-year-old male in a to-catch-a predator style video. A student watching the stream had screen recorded the encounter and posted it on his Snapchat story, which soon spread around to other students, parents, and eventually made its way to school administration. Right after school administration was informed of the incident, they announced he would be placed on administrative leave for further investigation. He was later fired.

In August 2025, a video went viral showing a student assaulting a teacher at an assembly in the school's gymnasium. The student landed several blows before he was tackled by the school resource officer.

== Notable alumni ==
- Glen Edwards - World War II pilot and USAF test pilot
- Urijah Faber - wrestler; retired professional Mixed Martial Artist, former WEC Featherweight Champion, and former UFC Bantamweight Contender
