= Edwards Air Force Base =

US Air Force base in California

- Near Lancaster, California in the United States
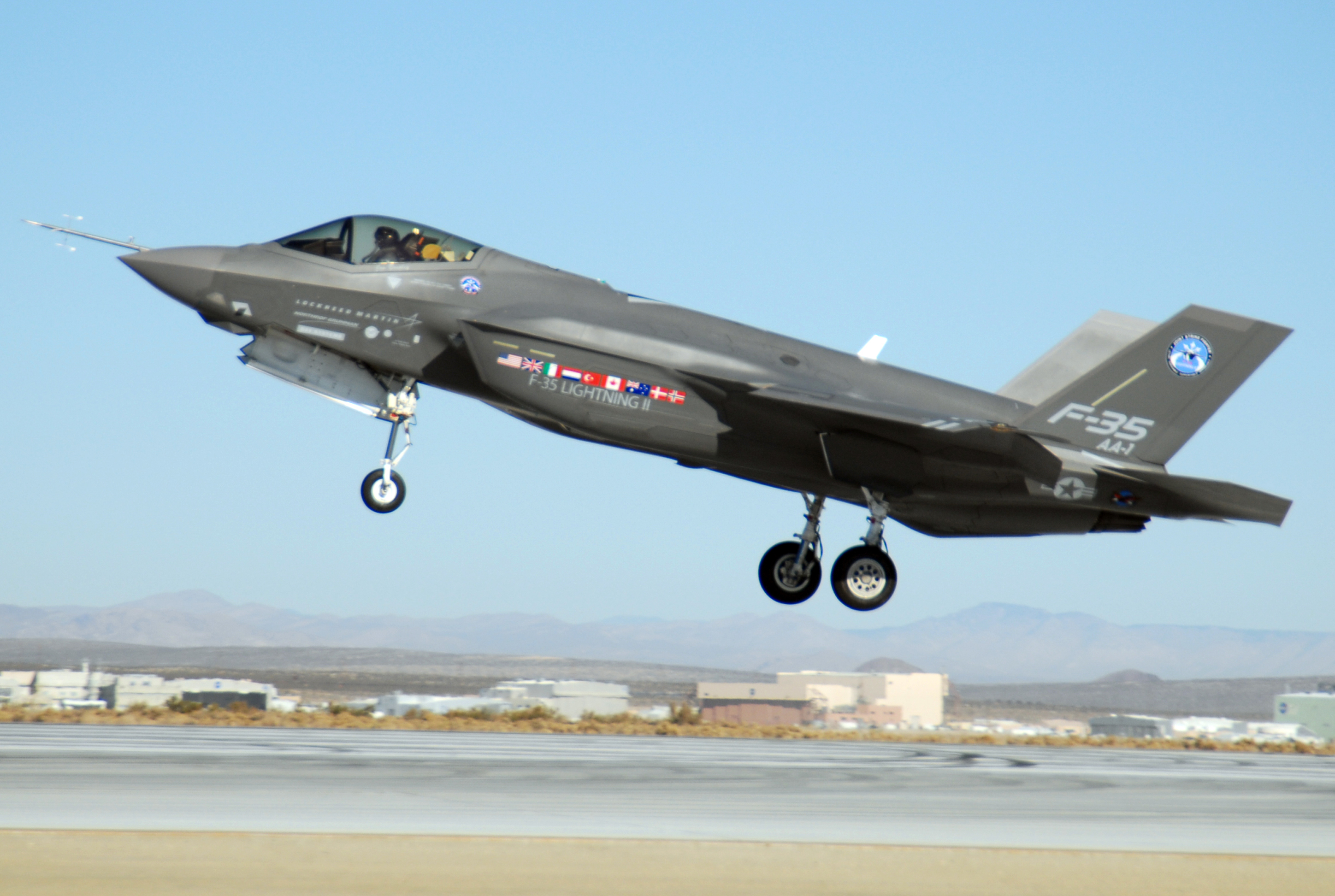
- An F-35 Lightning II of the 461st Flight Test Squadron taking off at Edwards Air Force Base

Site information
- Type: US Air Force Base
- Owner: Department of Defense
- Operator: US Air Force
- Controlled by: Air Force Materiel Command
- Condition: Operational
- Website: www.edwards.af.mil

Location
- Location within California Location within the United States
- Coordinates: 34°54′20″N 117°53′01″W

Site history
- Built: 1933 (as Muroc Bombing and Gunnery Range)
- In use: 1933 – present

Garrison information
- Current commander: Thomas M. Tauer
- Garrison: 412th Test Wing

Airfield information
- Identifiers: IATA: EDW, ICAO: KEDW, FAA LID: EDW, WMO: 723810
- Elevation: 704.3 metres (2,311 ft) AMSL
Runways
Direction	Length and surface
05R/23L	4,579.3 metres (15,024 ft) Concrete
05L/23R	3,657.6 metres (12,000 ft) Concrete
07/25	2,438.4 metres (8,000 ft) (South Base)
06/24	1,828.1 metres (5,998 ft) Asphalt
- Other airfield facilities: 1x V/STOL pad

Edwards Air Force Base (AFB; IATA: EDW, ICAO: KEDW, FAA LID: EDW) is a United States Air Force installation in California. Most of the base sits in Kern County, but its eastern end is in San Bernardino County and a southern arm is in Los Angeles County. The hub of the base is Edwards, California. Established in the 1930s as Muroc Field, the facility was renamed Muroc Army Airfield and then Muroc Air Force Base before its final renaming in 1950 for World War II USAAF veteran and test pilot Capt. Glen Edwards.

Edwards is the home of the Air Force Test Center, Air Force Test Pilot School, and NASA's Armstrong Flight Research Center. It is the Air Force Materiel Command center for conducting and supporting research and development of flight, as well as testing and evaluating aerospace systems from concept to combat. It also hosts many test activities conducted by America's commercial aerospace industry.

Notable occurrences at Edwards include Chuck Yeager's flight that broke the sound barrier in the Bell X-1, test flights of the North American X-15, the first landings of the Space Shuttle, and the 1986 around-the-world flight of the Rutan Voyager.

== History ==
=== Origins ===
A water stop on the Santa Fe Railroad since 1882, the site was largely unsettled until the early 20th century. In 1910, Ralph, Clifford and Effie Corum built a homestead on the edge of Rogers Dry Lake. The Corums proved instrumental in attracting other settlers and building infrastructure in the area, and when a post office was commissioned for the area, they named it Muroc, a reversal of the Corum name, due to the presence of a town named Coram elsewhere in California.

Conscious that March Field was located in an area of increasing growth in Riverside County, and with the need for bombing and gunnery ranges for his units, base and 1st Wing commander Lieutenant Colonel Henry H. "Hap" Arnold began the process of acquiring land next to Muroc Dry Lake for a new bombing range away from populated areas in August 1932; the last tract was not acquired until 1939. The facility established to support the range, initially called "Mohave Field" for the nearby community of Mohave, was Muroc Field. In October 1935, five men under a Sergeant Folgleman were sent to the area from March Field. They put out circular bombing targets in the desert. For the next two years aircraft shuttled back and forth between Muroc Dry Lake and March Field for Crew Bombing Practice.

At this time, another colorful character in Edwards' history, Pancho Barnes, built her renowned Rancho Oro Verde Fly-Inn Dude Ranch that would be the scene of many parties and celebrations to come. The dry lake was a hive of hot rodding, with racing on the playa. The runway on which the Space Shuttle landed follows the route that hosted racing in the 1930s.

The first major aerial activity occurred at Muroc in 1937 when the entire Army Air Corps participated in a large-scale maneuver. From then on, the bombing range grew in size. When Arnold became Chief of the Air Corps in 1938, the service was given a renewed focus on research and development. Muroc Field drew attention because the nearby dry lake was so flat (Arnold described it as "level as a billiard table") that it could serve as a giant runway, ideal for flight testing. Over US$120 million was spent to develop the base in the 1940s and expand it to 301,000 acres (470 sq mi; 1,220 km^{2}). The base's main 15,000-foot (4,600 m) runway was completed in a single pour of concrete.

=== World War II ===
On the afternoon of 7 December 1941, the 41st Bombardment Group and the 6th Reconnaissance Squadron moved to Muroc from Davis-Monthan Army Airfield, Arizona, with a collection of Douglas B-18 Bolos, North American B-25 Mitchells, and an A-29 Hudson. On Christmas Eve, the 30th Bombardment Group and the 2d Reconnaissance Squadron arrived from New Orleans Army Airbase, Louisiana, for crew training. On 23 July 1942, the Muroc Bombing and Gunnery Range, Muroc Lake, California, was designated as a separate post (Exempted Status). The name of the facility at the time was "Army Air Base, Muroc Lake."

In July 1942, Muroc Army Airfield became a separate airfield from March Field and was placed under the jurisdiction of Fourth Air Force. Throughout the war years, the primary mission at Muroc was providing final combat training for bomber and fighter aircrews just before overseas deployment. Among its sub-bases and auxiliaries were:

- Bishop Army Airfield 37°22′23″N 118°21′49″W
- Blythe Army Airfield 33°37′09″N 114°43′00″W
- Palmdale Army Airfield 33°37′43″N 118°05′04″W
- Desert Center Army Airfield 33°44′52″N 115°19′31″W
- Gary Army Airfield 33°40′45″N 114°38′36″W

Muroc was initially used for IV Bomber Command Operational Unit training. The North American B-25 Mitchell 41st and 30th Bombardment Groups and the Douglas A-20 Havoc 47th Bombardment Groups trained at the station in early 1942. The training provided newly graduated pilots eight to 12 weeks of training as a team using the same aircraft they would use in combat. In 1942, the training mission was transferred to IV Fighter Command, with Lockheed P-38 Lightning OTU training for the 78th and 81st Fighter Groups. In 1943, the 360th Fighter Group and 382d Bombardment Groups were assigned permanently to Muroc for P-38 Lightning and B-24 Liberator Replacement Training (RTU) of personnel.

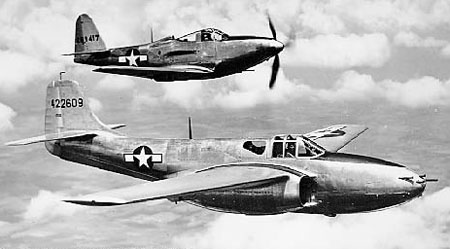
First production P-59A with a P-63 behind

In the spring of 1942, the Mojave Desert station was chosen as a secluded site for testing America's first jet, the super-secret Bell Aircraft P-59 Airacomet jet fighter. The immense volume of flight tests being conducted at Wright Field, in Ohio, helped drive a search for a new, isolated site where a "Top Secret" airplane could undergo tests "away from prying eyes." The urgent need to complete the P-59 program without delay dictated a location with good, year-round flying weather, and the risks inherent in the radical new technology to be demonstrated on the aircraft dictated a spacious landing field. After examining a number of locations around the country, they selected a site along the north shore of the enormous, flat surface of Rogers Dry Lake about six miles away from the training base at Muroc.

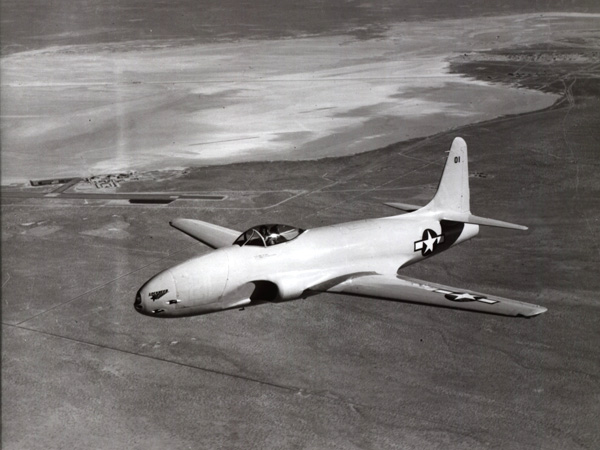
Lockheed XP-80A "Gray Ghost", 1945

Ground tests began five days after the first XP-59 arrived on 21 September 1942. First flight took place on 30 September when the XP-59 rose to 10 feet (3.0 m) altitude for 0.5 miles (0.80 km) during taxi testing. However, the first official flight was 1 October 1942 with NACA, Navy Bureau of Aeronautics, Royal Air Force, Army, Bell and General Electric personnel on hand.

As with virtually all of the test programs conducted during the war years, most of the actual flight test work on the P-59 was conducted by the contractor. Although Army Air Forces (AAF) pilots flew the aircraft from time to time, and flight test engineers from Wright Field reviewed the data, the formal preliminary military test and evaluation program did not commence until the fall of 1943, a year after the first flight. Designed to validate the contractor's reports, this preliminary evaluation consisted of a very limited number of flights and was essentially completed within a month. Formal operational suitability and accelerated service tests did not get underway until 1944, well after the AAF had decided that the airplane would not be suitable for combat operations and would, instead, be relegated to a training role.

The P-59s were tested at Muroc from October 1942 through February 1944 without a single accident and, though the aircraft did not prove to be combat worthy, the successful conduct of its test program, combined with the success of the Lockheed XP-80 program which followed it in early 1944, sealed the future destiny of the remote high desert installation. Muroc would thenceforth become synonymous with the cutting edge of the turbojet revolution in America.

Aircraft testing continued at this desert "Army Air Base", then on 8 November 1943, the base title was changed to "Muroc Army Air Field, Muroc". In the fall of 1944, Eighth Air Force ran tests to determine how well conventional fighters stood up against jets. Also, in October 1944, a small detachment arrived at the base for experimental work in rocket firing and achieved such success that they remained through most of 1945.

Other World War II test flights included the Northrop JB-1 Bat.

In 1943, a replica of a Japanese cruiser, nicknamed "Muroc Maru", was constructed in Rogers Dry Lake where it was used for bombing training until 1950.

=== Postwar era ===
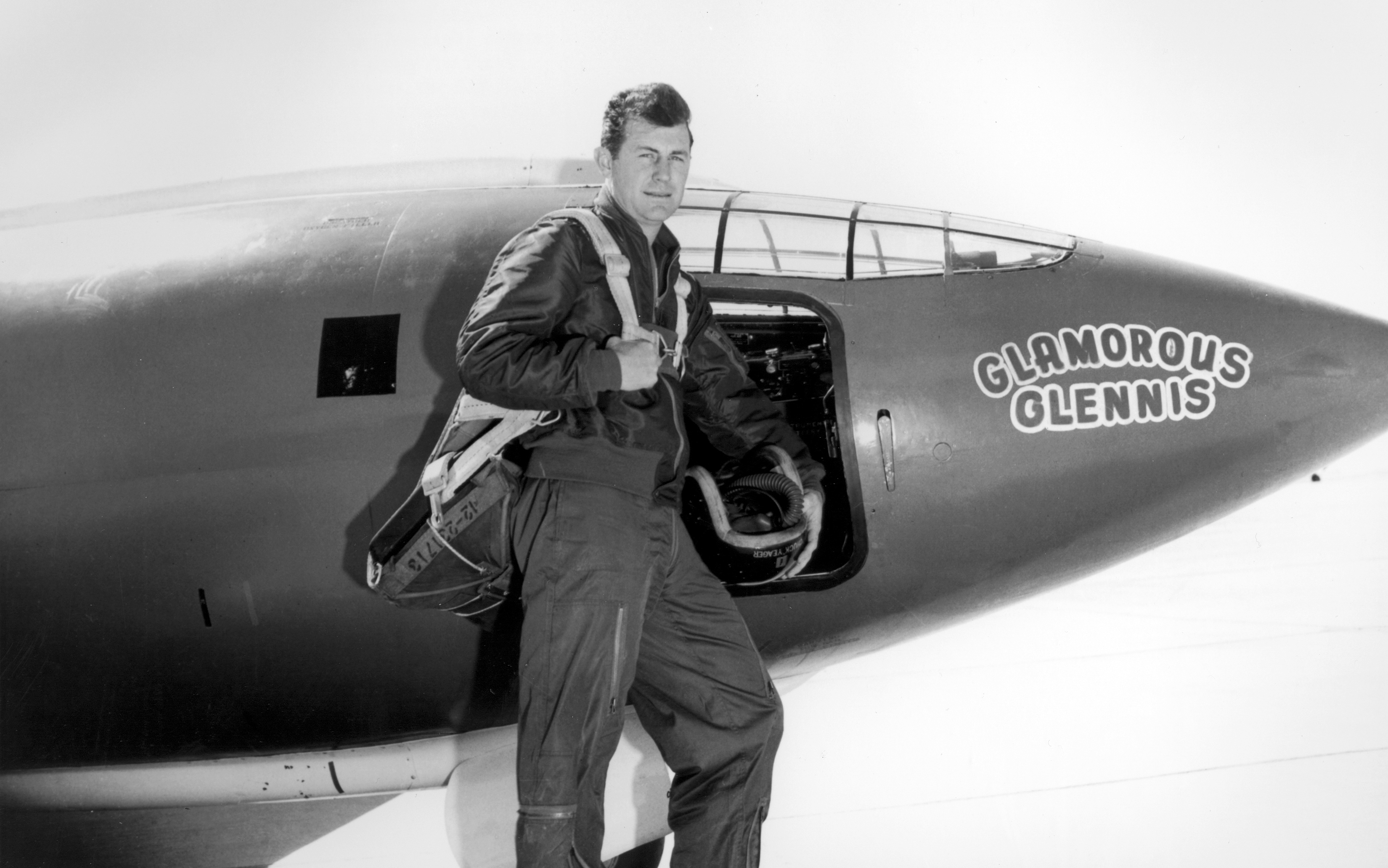
Chuck Yeager next to experimental aircraft Bell X-1 #1, Glamorous Glennis, 1947

With the end of the war, Fourth Air Force relinquished command of Muroc Army Airfield on 16 October 1945 and jurisdiction was transferred to Air Technical Service Command, becoming Air Materiel Command in 1946. Test work on the Lockheed P-80 Shooting Star was the primary mission of the base for the greater part of the fall of 1945. The Consolidated Vultee XP-81 single-seat, long-range escort fighter and Republic XP-84 Thunderjet fighter arrived at the base in early 1946 for flight testing. It was obvious even at this embryonic stage of base development that the Army Air Force desert station was destined to become a proving ground for aircraft and a testing site for experimental airplanes.

The success of these programs attracted a new type of research activity to the base in late 1946. The rocket-powered Bell X-1 was the first in a long series of experimental airplanes designed to prove or disprove aeronautical concepts—to probe the most challenging unknowns of flight and solve its mysteries. Further evidence of things to come was experienced on 14 October 1947 when Captain Charles "Chuck" Yeager flew the small bullet-shaped airplane to become the first human to exceed the speed of sound.

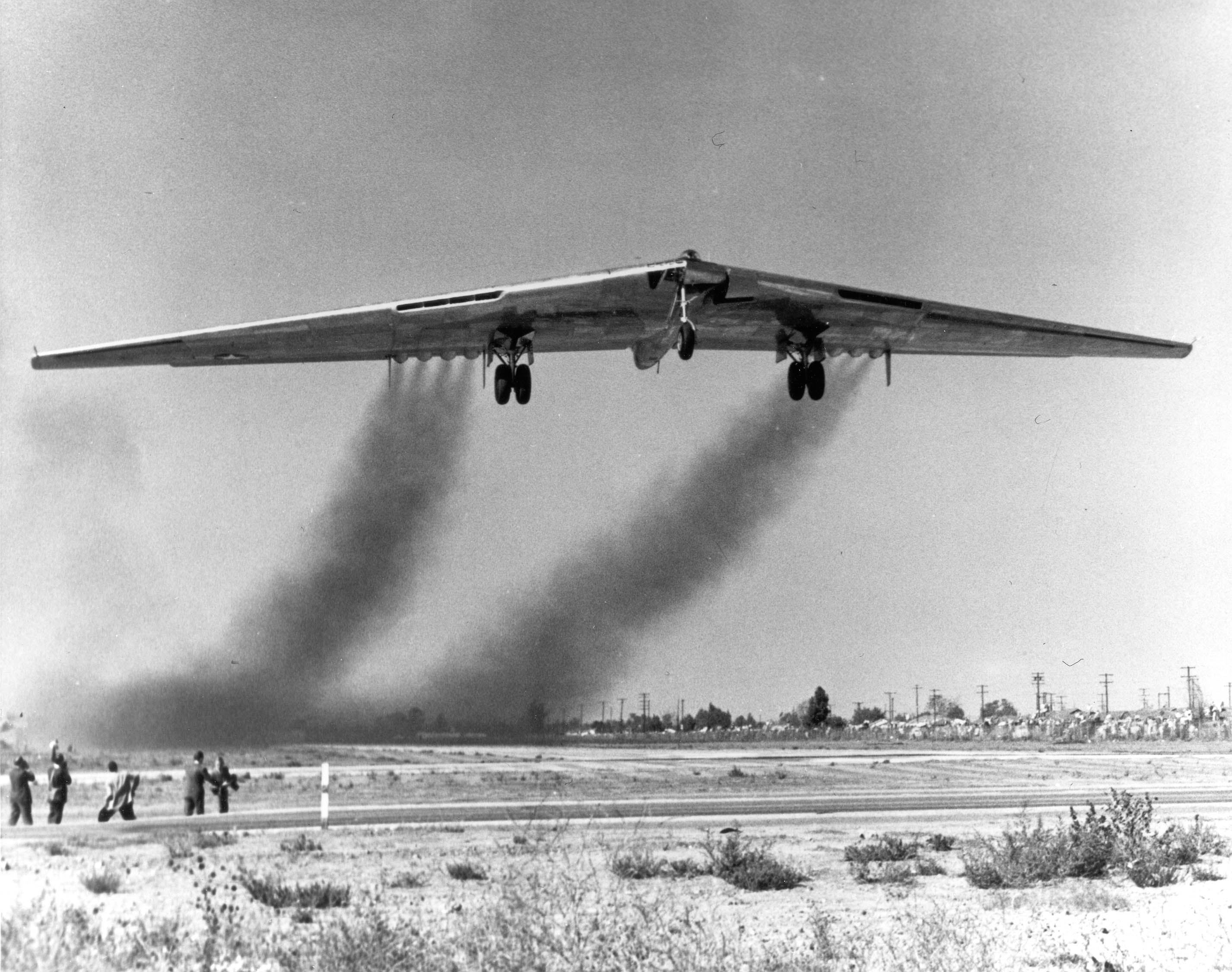
Northrop YB-49 taking off for the first time on 21 October 1947

Four months later, on 10 February 1948, Muroc AAF was re-designated Muroc Air Force Base with the establishment of the United States Air Force as a separate military service. Units attached or assigned to the base at the time were the 4144th Army Air Force Base Unit, the 3208th Strategic Bomb Test Squadron along with communications and weather detachments. On 20 August 1948, the 4144th Air Force Base Unit was re-designated as the 2759th AF Base Unit and with the adoption of the Hobson Plan, as the 2759th Experimental Wing.

With the X-1, flight testing at Muroc began to assume two distinct identities. Highly experimental research programs—such as the X-3, X-4, X-5 and XF-92A—were typically flown in conjunction with the National Advisory Committee for Aeronautics, or NACA, and were conducted in a methodical fashion to answer largely theoretical questions. Then, as now, the great bulk of flight testing at Muroc focused on evaluations of the capabilities of aircraft and systems proposed for the operational inventory.

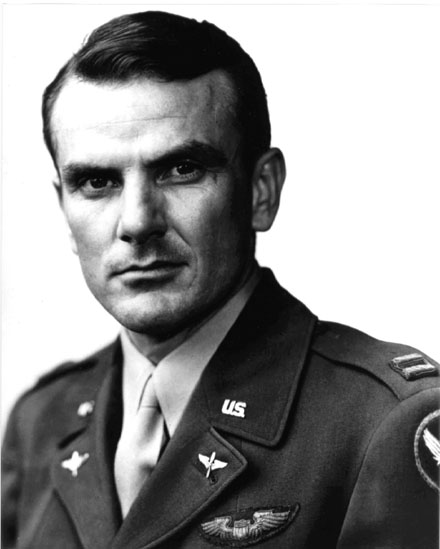
Captain Glen Edwards, namesake of the base, USAAF veteran and test pilot. The base was renamed in Edwards' honor in 1949

In December 1949, Muroc was renamed Edwards Air Force Base in honor of Captain Glen Edwards (1918–1948), who was killed a year earlier in the crash of the Northrop YB-49 Flying Wing. During World War II, he flew A-20 Havoc light attack bombers in the North African campaign on 50 hazardous, low-level missions against German tanks, convoys, troops, bridges, airfields, and other tactical targets. Edwards, from Alberta, Canada, became a test pilot in 1943 and spent much of his time at Muroc Army Air Field, on California's high desert, testing wide varieties of experimental prototype aircraft. He died in the crash of a Northrop YB-49 flying wing near Muroc AFB on 5 June 1948. From the time Edwards Air Force Base was named, speed and altitude records began to pile up as new aircraft were developed and the base started to build and branch out significantly.

A major reason for the growth of Edwards AFB was the nearness of West Coast aircraft manufacturers. However, another major reason was the decision in 1947 to build a missile test facility on the base. The need for a static missile faculty to test high-thrust missile rocket engines was first envisioned in 1946 by the Power Plant Laboratory at Wright-Patterson Air Force Base. It was that decision that such a facility should be government-owned to prevent a single contractor exclusive advantages on Air Force contracts for high-thrust missile rocket power plants, and it would eliminate duplication of like facilities by different manufacturers. The choice of location in 1947 was the Leuhman Ridge east of Rogers Dry Lake on Edwards AFB. Construction began in November 1949 on what was to become the Experimental Rocket Engine Test Station.

=== Cold War ===
==== Flight testing ====
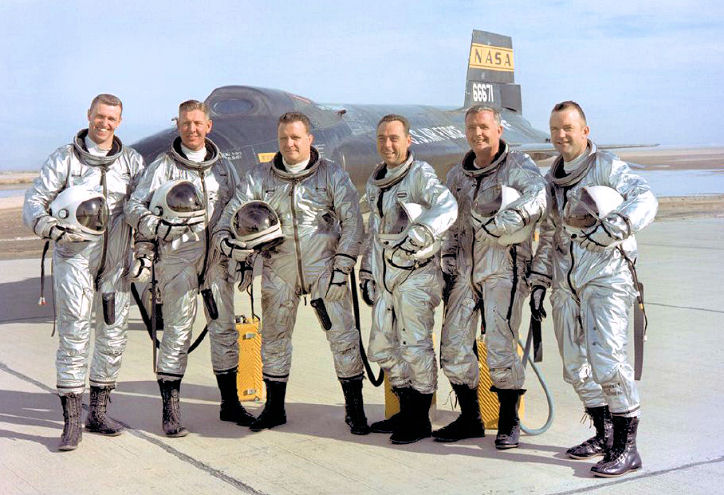
North American X-15A (AF Ser. No. 56-6671) with test pilots, Edwards AFB, California. Number 6671 was extensively damaged during emergency landing at Edwards AFB on 9 November 1962 with John McKay at the controls. Later modified as X-15A-2; now on display at the National Museum of the U.S. Air Force at Wright-Patterson AFB, OH.

Jurisdiction of Edwards AFB was transferred from Air Materiel Command on 2 April 1951 to the newly created Air Research and Development Command. Activation of the Air Force Flight Test Center (AFFTC) followed on 25 June 1951. Units designated and assigned to the Center at the time of activation were the 6510th Air Base Wing for station support units. The test flying units at Edwards were assigned directly to the AFFTC .

That same year, the U.S. Air Force Test Pilot School moved to Edwards from Wright Field, Ohio.

Its curriculum focused on the traditional field of performance testing and the relatively new field of stability and control, which had suddenly assumed critical importance with the dramatic increases in speed offered by the new turbojets. As the decade opened, the first-generation X-1 reached Mach 1.45 (1,776 km/h; 1,104 mph) and a 71,902 feet (13.6178 mi; 21.916 km) altitude, representing the edge of the envelope. The D-558-II Douglas Skyrocket soon surpassed these marks. In 1951, Douglas test pilot Bill Bridgeman flew the Skyrocket to a top speed of Mach 1.88 (2,303 km/h; 1,431 mph) and a peak altitude of 74,494 feet (14.1087 mi; 22.706 km). Then, in 1953, Marine Corps test pilot, Lieutenant Colonel Marion Carl, flew the same plane to an altitude of 83,235 feet (15.7642 mi; 25.370 km).

On 20 November 1951, the National Advisory Committee for Aeronautics' Scott Crossfield became the first man to reach Mach 2 as he piloted the Skyrocket to a speed of Mach 2.005 (2,456.2 km/h; 1,526.2 mph). Less than a month later, Major Chuck Yeager topped this record as he piloted the second-generation Bell X-1A to a top speed of Mach 2.44 (2,989 km/h; 1,857 mph) and, just nine months later, Major Arthur "Kit" Murray flew the same airplane to a new altitude record of 90,440 feet (17.129 mi; 27.57 km).

These records stood for less than three years. In September 1956, Captain Iven Kincheloe became the first man to soar above 100,000 feet (19 mi; 30 km), as he piloted the Bell X-2 to a then-remarkable altitude of 126,200 feet (23.90 mi; 38.5 km). Flying the same airplane just weeks later on 27 September, Captain Mel Apt became the first to exceed Mach 3 (3,700 km/h; 2,300 mph), accelerating to a speed of Mach 3.2 (3,920 km/h; 2,440 mph). His moment of glory was tragically brief, however. Just seconds after attaining top speed, the X-2 tumbled violently out of control and Apt was never able to recover.

With the loss of the X-2, the search for many of the answers to the riddles of high-Mach flight had to be postponed until the arrival of the most ambitious of the rocket planes—the North American X-15.

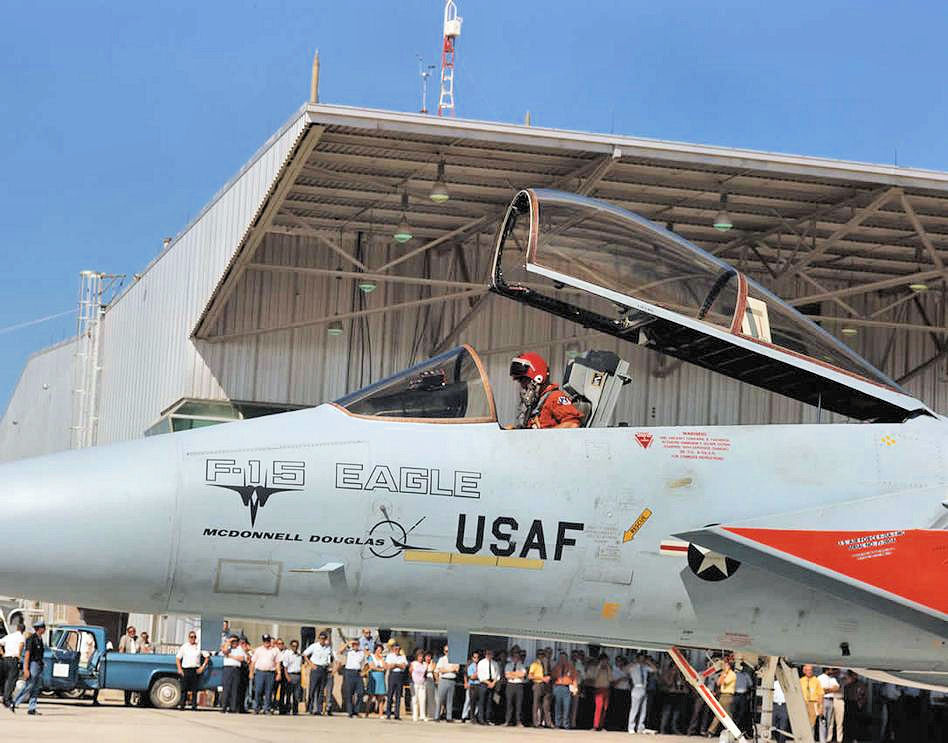
McDonnell Douglas F-15A-1-MC Eagle (AF Ser. No. 71-0280) (also known as YF-15A, first F-15 manufactured) preparing to make its historic first flight on 27 July 1972 at Edwards AFB, CA with the 6512th Test Squadron. This airplane was later used for exploring the F-15's flight envelope, handling qualities and external stores carriage capabilities.

Meanwhile, the turbojet revolution had reached a high plateau at Edwards. By the time the base was officially designated the U.S. Air Force Flight Test Center in June 1951, more than 40 different types of aircraft had first taken flight at the base and the nation's first generation of jet-powered combat airplanes had already completed development. One of them, the North American F-86 Sabre, was dominating the skies over Korea.

The promise of the turbojet revolution and the supersonic breakthrough were realized in the 1950s, as the Center tested and developed the first generation of true supersonic fighters—the famed "Century Series" F-100 Super Sabre, F-101 Voodoo, F-102 Delta Dagger, F-104 Starfighter, F-105 Thunderchief and F-106 Delta Dart, and, in the process, defined the basic speed and altitude envelopes for fighter aircraft that still prevail to this day. The Center also played a pivotal role in the development of systems that would provide the United States with true intercontinental power projection capabilities as it tested aircraft such as the B-52 Stratofortress, C-133 Cargomaster and KC-135 Stratotanker, as well as the YC-130 Hercules which served as the basis for a classic series of tactical transports that would continue in frontline service until well into the 21st century. It also supported the development of the extremely high-altitude and long-range Lockheed U-2 and the dazzling ultra-performance capabilities of the B-58 Hustler, the world's first Mach 2 bomber.

Throughout the 1950s, American airplanes regularly broke absolute speed and altitude records at Edwards, but nothing compared to the arrival of the North American X-15 in 1961. The program got under way in earnest in 1961 when Maj. Robert M. "Bob" White became the first man to exceed Mach 4, this was achieved on March 7 when he accelerated to Mach 4.43 (5,427 km/h; 3,372 mph). Mach 5 was exceeded just three months later when he reached a speed of Mach 5.27 (6,456 km/h; 4,012 mph) on 23 June. Mach 6 was tackled soon after on the 9th of March during the X - 15s first full-powered flight where he flew to a speed of Mach 6.04 (7,399 km/h; 4,598 mph). Major White also became the first man to fly an airplane in space when he climbed to 314,750 feet (59.612 mi; 95.94 km) on 17 July 1962. NASA's Joe Walker flew the airplane to its peak altitude of 354,200 feet (67.08 mi; 108.0 km) on 22 August 1963 and Maj William J. "Pete" Knight reached Mach 6.72 (8,232 km/h; 5,115 mph) in the modified X-15A-2 on 3 October 1967, a speed that remains the highest ever attained in an airplane.

In addition to the X-15 Program, AFFTC and NASA also teamed up to explore a new concept called "lifting reentry" with a series of wingless lifting body aircraft. These rocket powered-vehicles – the M2-F2, M2-F3, HL-10, X-24A and X-24B – paved the way for the Space Shuttle and future spaceplane designs when they demonstrated that they could make precision landings after high-speed gliding descents from high altitude.

The major aircraft systems that were tested and developed during the 1960s, the T-38 Talon, B-52H Stratofortress, F-4 and RF-4 Phantom II, the F-111 and FB-111, C-141 Starlifter and C-5 Galaxy, all became mainstays in the USAF operational inventory. Another aircraft which gained world fame in the late 1960s at Edwards was the Lockheed YF-12A, a precursor to the SR-71 Blackbird. The aircraft shattered nine records in one day of testing at Edwards. The SR-71's full capabilities remain classified, but the records set on 1 May 1965 included a sustained speed of 2,070 miles per hour (3,330 km/h) and an altitude of 80,257 feet (15 mi; 24 km).

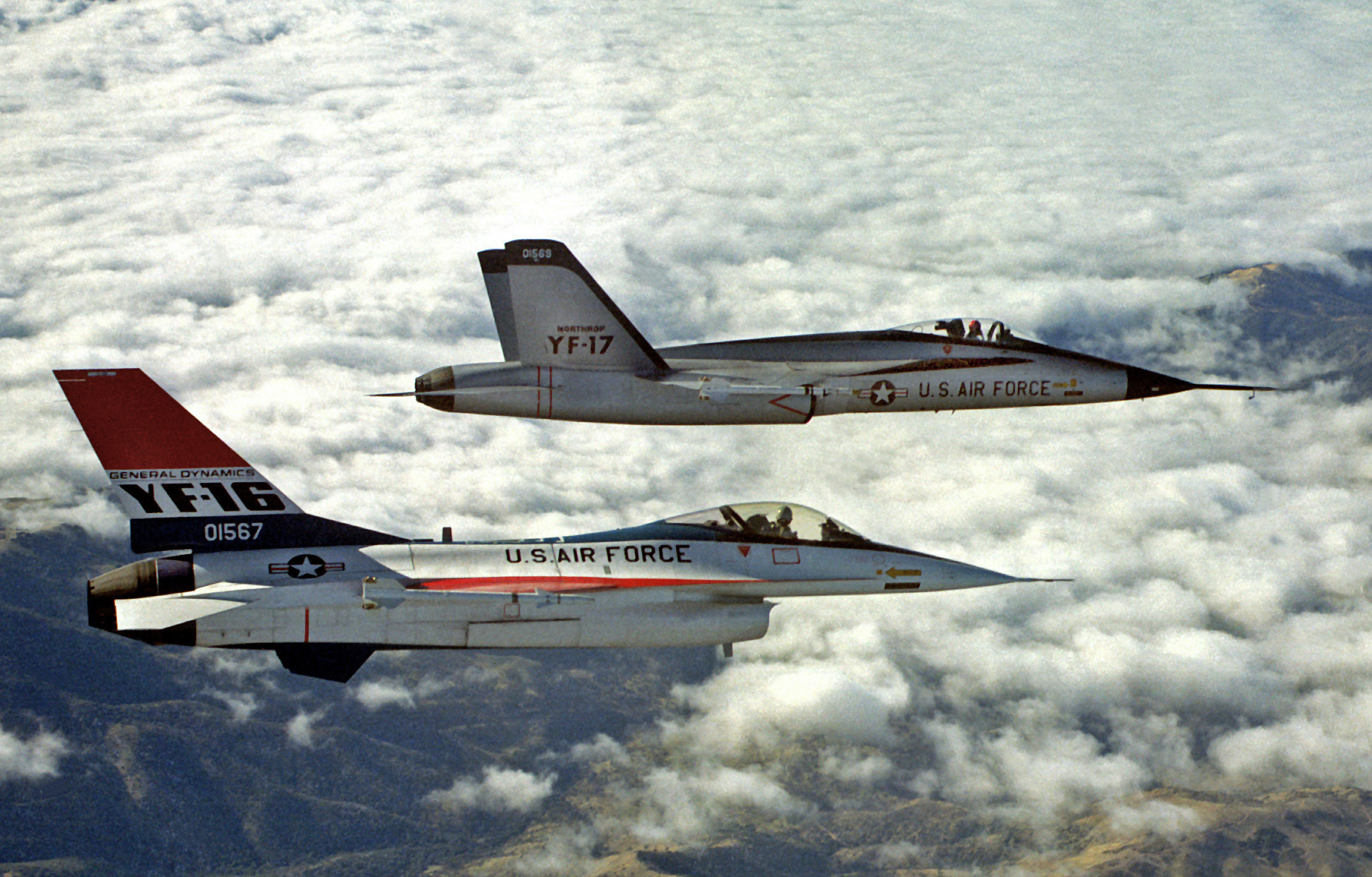
YF-16 and YF-17 in flight during their competitive fly-off, 1974. Over 4,000 production F-16s were built after the competition. The YF-17 was the basis for the highly successful United States Navy F/A-18 Hornet.

New aircraft types arrived in the 1970s: the F-15 Eagle with its advanced engine and fire-control system; the single-engine F-16 Fighting Falcon with its "fly-by-wire" flight control system; and the B-1 Lancer with its multitude of sophisticated offensive and defensive systems. These planes more than bore out the prophecy concerning the ever-increasing importance of systems testing and integration. Moreover, another major new element of complexity was soon introduced into the flight test process.

At a remote location in 1978 and 1979, an AFFTC test pilot and a pair of flight test engineers were engaged in proof-of-concept testing with Lockheed's "low-observable" technology demonstrator, dubbed "Have Blue." The successful completion of those tests led immediately to the development of a new subsonic attack aircraft that was designated the F-117A Nighthawk.

The capabilities of existing aircraft such as the F-15 and F-16 have been continually refined and expanded, even as totally new aircraft and systems incorporating radical new technologies are developed for future operational use. The dual-role F-15E, for example, was developed in the 1980s and went on to demonstrate capable combat effectiveness in the Persian Gulf conflict of the early 90s. The Low Altitude Navigation and Targeting Infrared for Night, or LANTIRN, system revolutionized air-to-ground combat operations during the same conflict by denying opposing forces nighttime cover.

The late 1980s also witnessed the arrival of the first giant flying wing to soar over the base in nearly 40 years. The thin silhouette, compound curves and other low-observable characteristics of the B-2 Spirit bomber represented third-generation stealth technology, following the SR-71 and F-117.

The 1980s also saw Edwards host a demonstration of America's space warfare capabilities when a highly modified F-15 Eagle launched an ASM-135 anti-satellite missile at the dead P78-1 (or Solwind) satellite and destroyed it. In 1986, Dick Rutan and Jeana Yeager launched from Edwards to set a new aviation record by piloting the first non-stop, around-the-world flight on a single tank of fuel in the Rutan Voyager.

==== Ground research ====
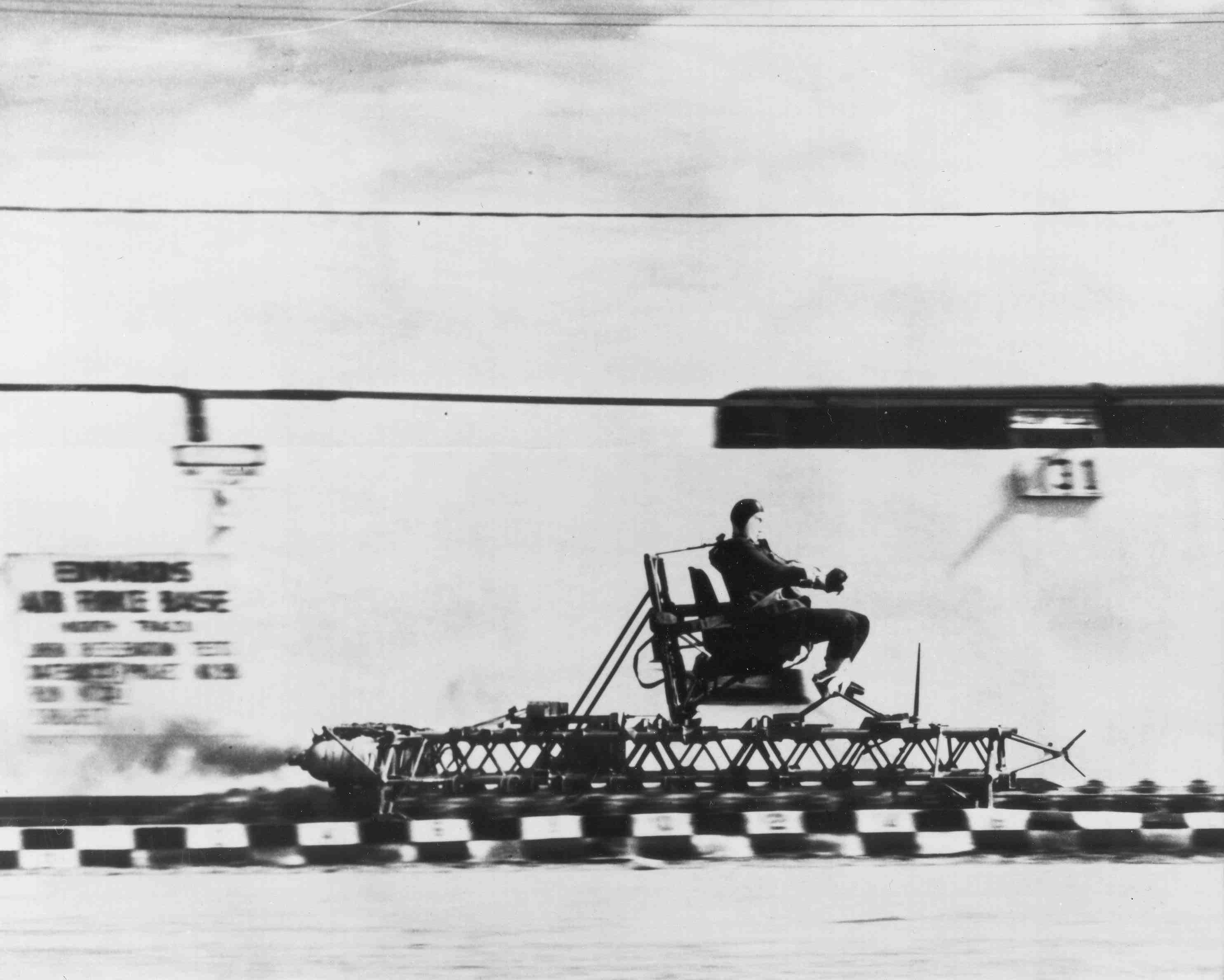
Lt. Col. John Stapp riding the rocket sled Gee Whiz

Extensive aviation research was also conducted on the ground at Edwards. Two rocket sled tracks pioneered important developments and research for the Air Force. The first 2,000-foot (610 m) track was built by Northrop in 1944 near what is currently the North Base. Originally intended to help develop a V-1 flying-bomb-style weapon that never left the drawing board, the track found use after the war as a test area for V-2 rockets captured from Nazi Germany in Operation Paperclip. Later, Lt. Col. John Stapp appropriated the track for his MX981 project and installed what was believed to be one of the most powerful mechanical braking systems ever constructed. His deceleration tests led the press to nickname him the "fastest man on earth" and the "bravest man in the Air Force".

The results from the first track prompted the Air Force to build a second in 1948. Located just south of Rogers Lake, the 10,000-foot (1.9 mi; 3.0 km) track was capable of supersonic speeds. Its first project was the development of the SM-62 Snark cruise missile. This track was so successful that an extension was constructed, and on 13 May 1959, the full 20,000-foot (3.8 mi; 6.1 km) track was opened. After the Navy had conducted research on the UGM-27 Polaris ballistic missile, the track was used to develop ejection seats that could be used at supersonic speeds. Though this program was a success, a budgetary review concluded that the track was too expensive to maintain, and the track was decommissioned on 24 May 1963. Before it was closed, a trial run set a world speed record of Mach 3.3 (4,040 km/h; 2,510 mph) before the test car broke up. After it closed, the rails were pulled up to help straighten Lancaster Boulevard.

==== Space Shuttle support ====
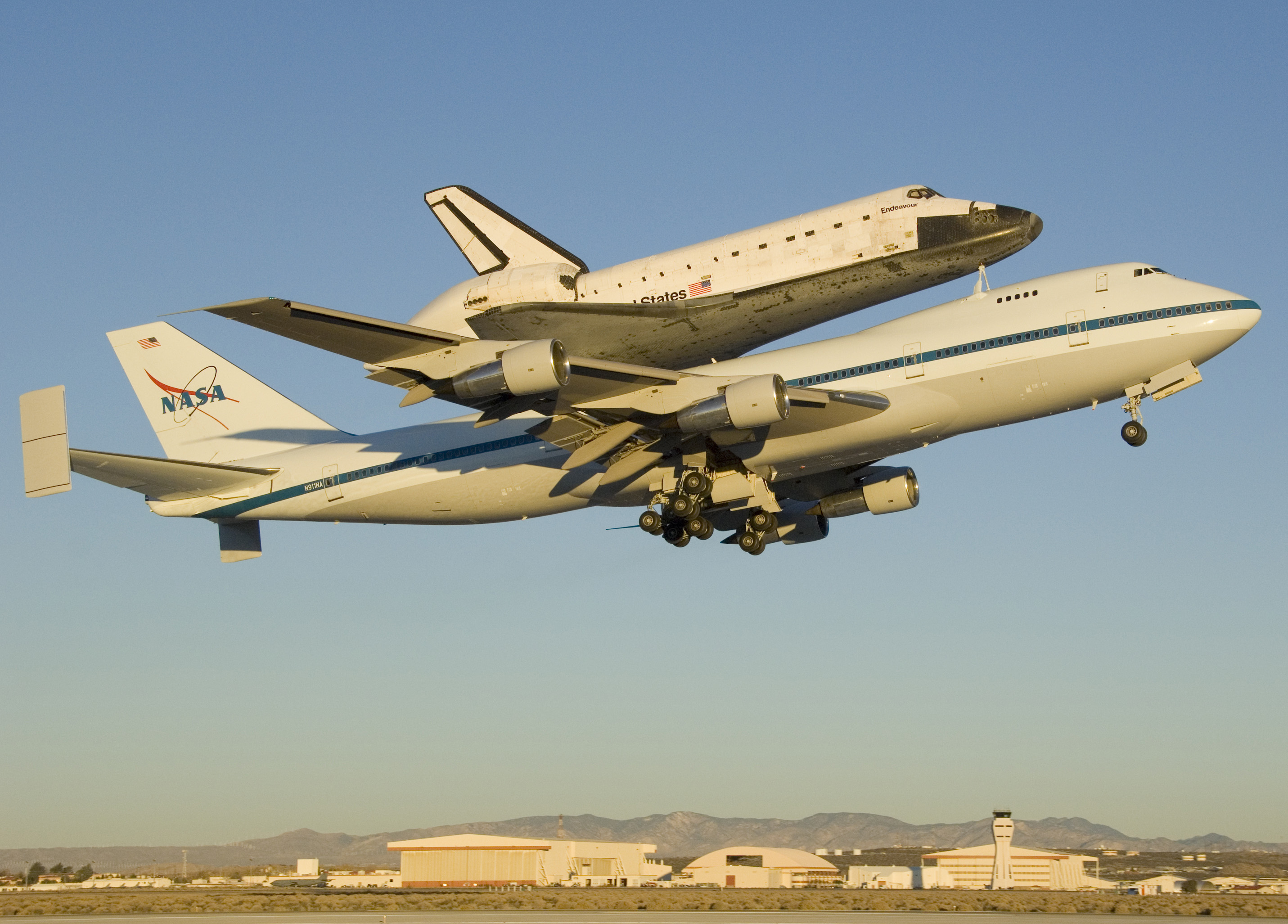
Space Shuttle Endeavour atop the Shuttle Carrier Aircraft taking off from Edwards AFB after the STS-126 mission, 9 December 2008. For a complete list of Space Shuttle landing locations, see: List of Space Shuttle missions.

After President Richard M. Nixon announced the Space Shuttle program on 5 January 1972, Edwards was chosen for Space Shuttle orbiter testing. The prototype Space Shuttle Enterprise was carried to altitude by the Shuttle Carrier Aircraft (SCA) and released. In all, 13 test flights were conducted with the Enterprise and the SCA to determine their flight characteristics and handling.

After Space Shuttle Columbia became the first shuttle launched into orbit on 12 April 1981, it returned to Edwards for landing. The airbase's immense lakebeds and its proximity to Plant 42, where the shuttle was serviced before relaunch, were important factors in its selection and it continued to serve as the primary landing area for the space shuttle until 1991. After that time, Kennedy Space Center (KSC) in Florida was favored. This saved the considerable cost of transporting the shuttle from California back to Florida, but Edwards AFB and White Sands Space Harbor continued to serve as backups for the duration of the shuttle program. Shuttles landed at Edwards as recently as 9 August 2005 (STS-114), 22 June 2007 (STS-117), 30 November 2008 (STS-126), 24 May 2009 (STS-125), and 11 September 2009 (STS-128) due to rain and ceiling events at the KSC Shuttle Landing Facility. STS-126 was the only mission to land on temporary runway 04 at Edwards, as the refurbished main runway was operational from STS-119 through to the retirement of the shuttles.

=== Into the 1990s ===
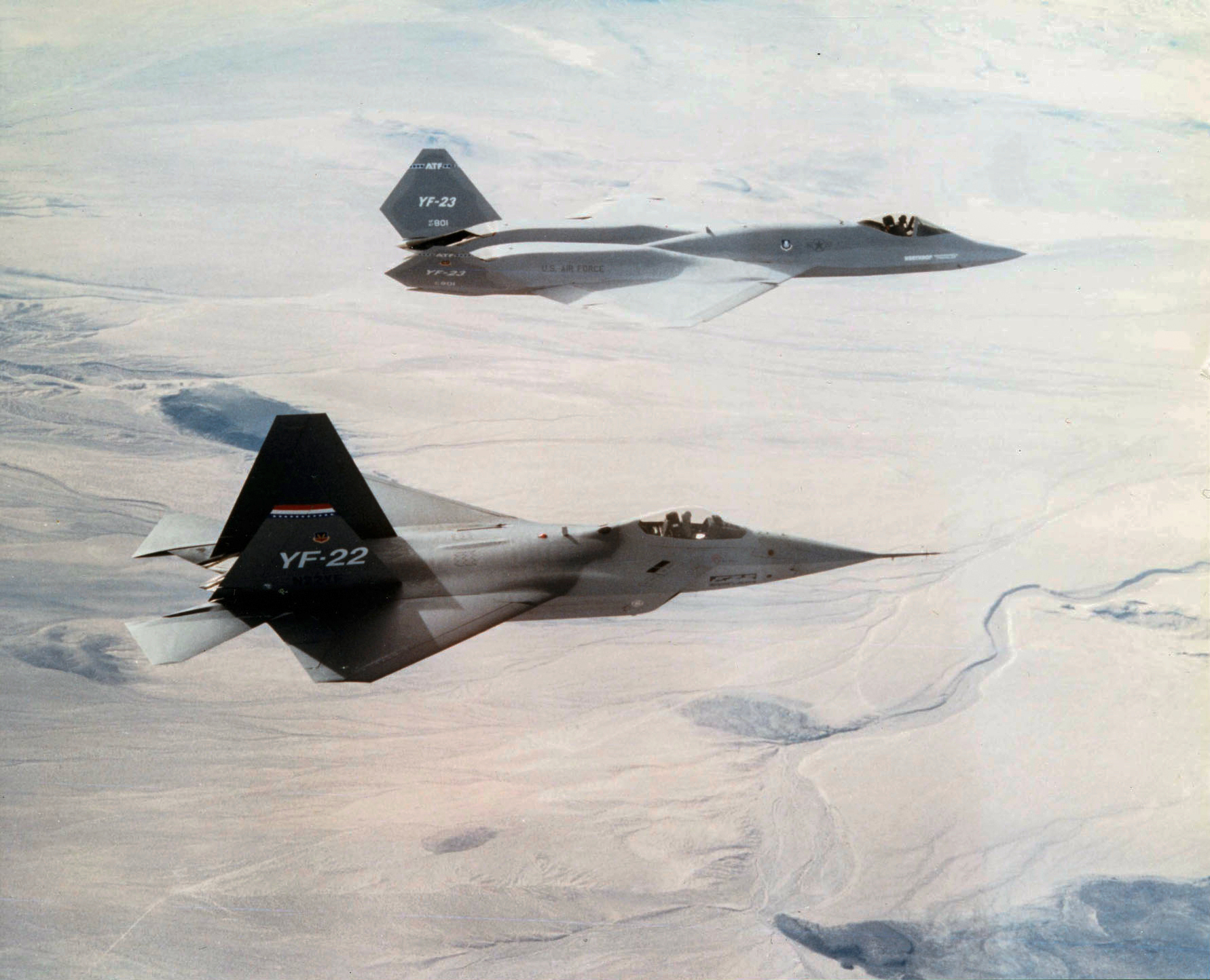
Prototype YF-22 and YF-23 fighters, 1991

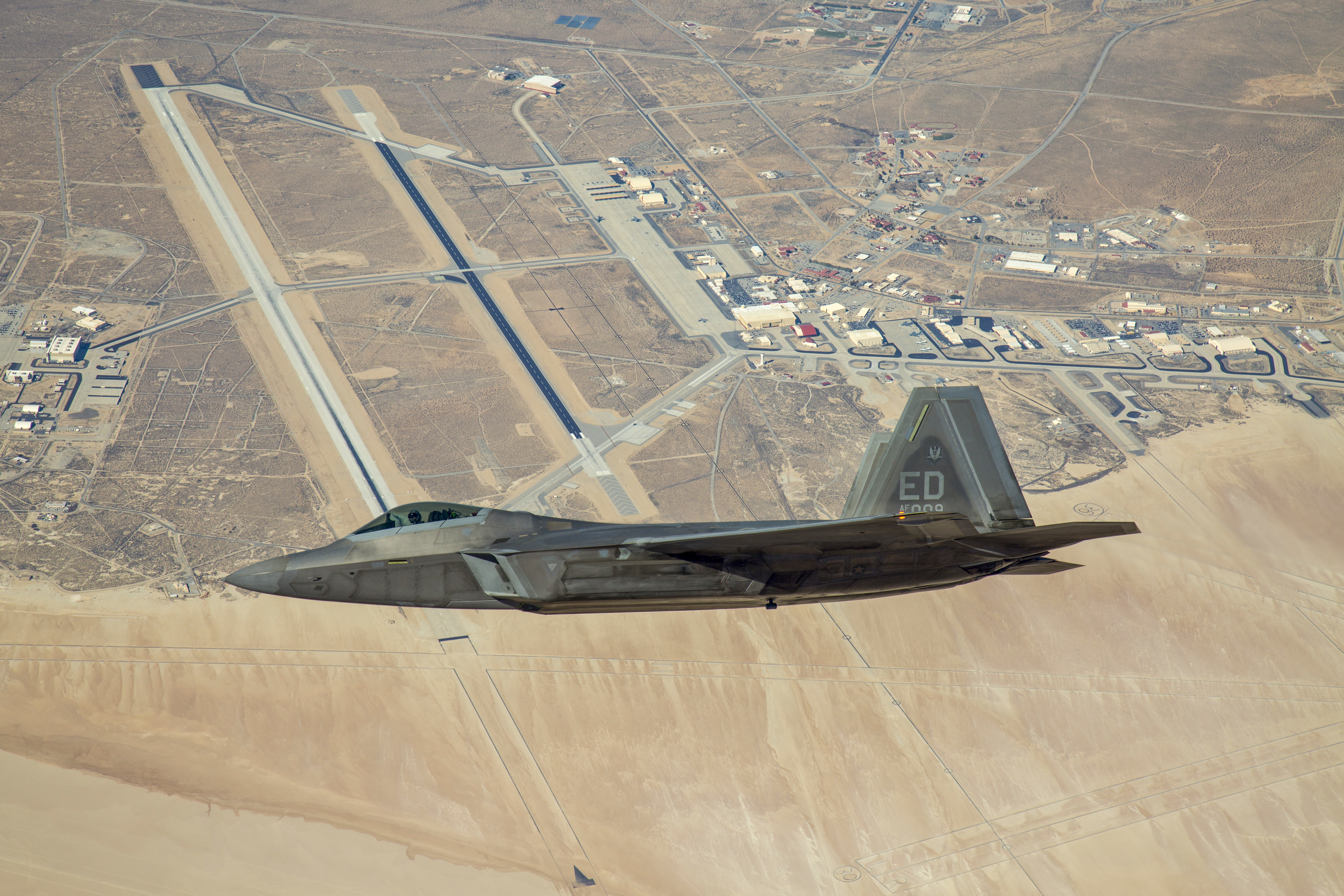
An F-22 Raptor assigned to the 411th Flight Test Squadron flies over Edwards Air Force Base, California, in 2018.

The end of the Cold War was marked by the arrival of the YF-22A and the YF-23A. The two prototype fighters were the first airplanes to blend stealth with agility and high-speed, supersonic cruise capability. The YF-22A was selected to become the Air Force's new advanced tactical fighter after a brief demonstration and validation risk reduction flight test program. Now named the Raptor, the F-22A continues to undergo test and evaluation at Edwards.

A new group of research projects came to Edwards in the 1990s. Global Hawk, an unmanned aerial vehicle that has been used extensively in Afghanistan and Iraq, made its first flight at Edwards in February 1998. The X-24, X-33, X-34, X-36 and X-38, a series of new lifting bodies, technology demonstrators and half-scale models were tested here by NASA during the decade.

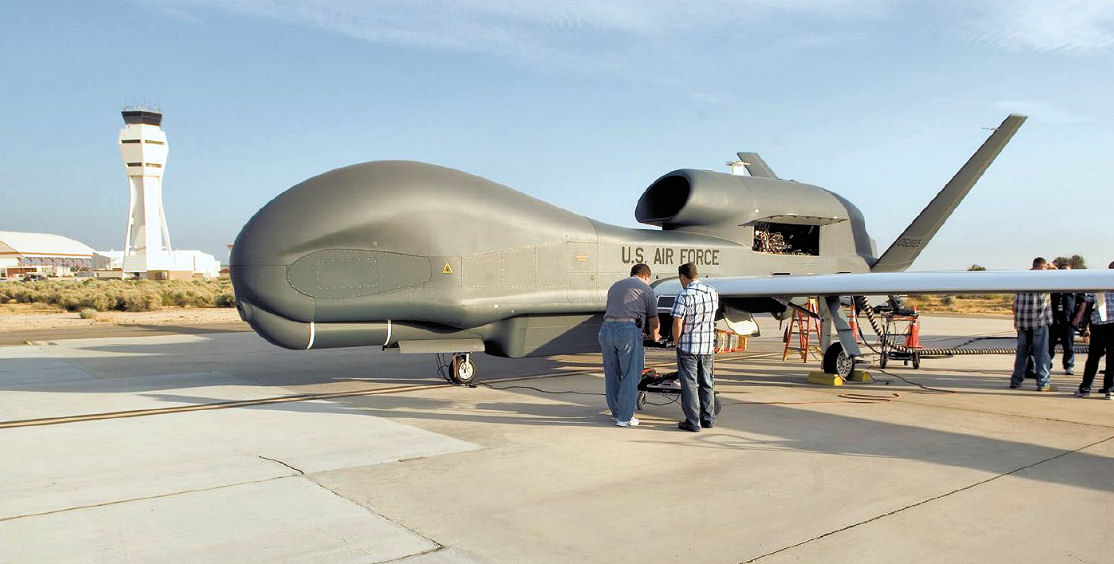
452d Flight Test Squadron Northrop Grumman Block 20 RQ-4B Global Hawk (05-2023) being serviced at Edwards AFB

The new millennium brought new projects with worldwide impact. The X-35A and X-32A, competing models for the Joint Strike Fighter program, made their first flights in September and October 2000. The X-35A won the competition in 2001 and will eventually be built in various versions for America's flying armed services and for foreign air forces as well. Also new are the RQ-4 Global Hawk, YAL-1 Airborne Laser, the B-52 synthetic fuel program, the C-17 Globemaster III, and many prototype unmanned aerial vehicles (UAVs).

Edwards is among the few U.S. military bases to have gained jobs since the Cold War. Under the DoD's Base Realignment and Closure process, several smaller bases have been decommissioned, and their facilities and responsibilities have been sent to Edwards, China Lake, and other large bases.

During 2012, the 95th Air Base Wing, the former base support unit at Edwards was inactivated and consolidated into the 412th Test Wing as part of the Air Force Flight Test Center transitioning into the Air Force Test Center. The five-Center consolidation not only better integrates the workforce but saves taxpayers approximately $109 million annually.

== Role and operations ==
The base has helped develop virtually every aircraft purchased by the Air Force since World War II. Almost every United States military aircraft since the 1950s has been at least partially tested at Edwards, and it has been the site of many aviation breakthroughs.

=== Air Force Test Center ===
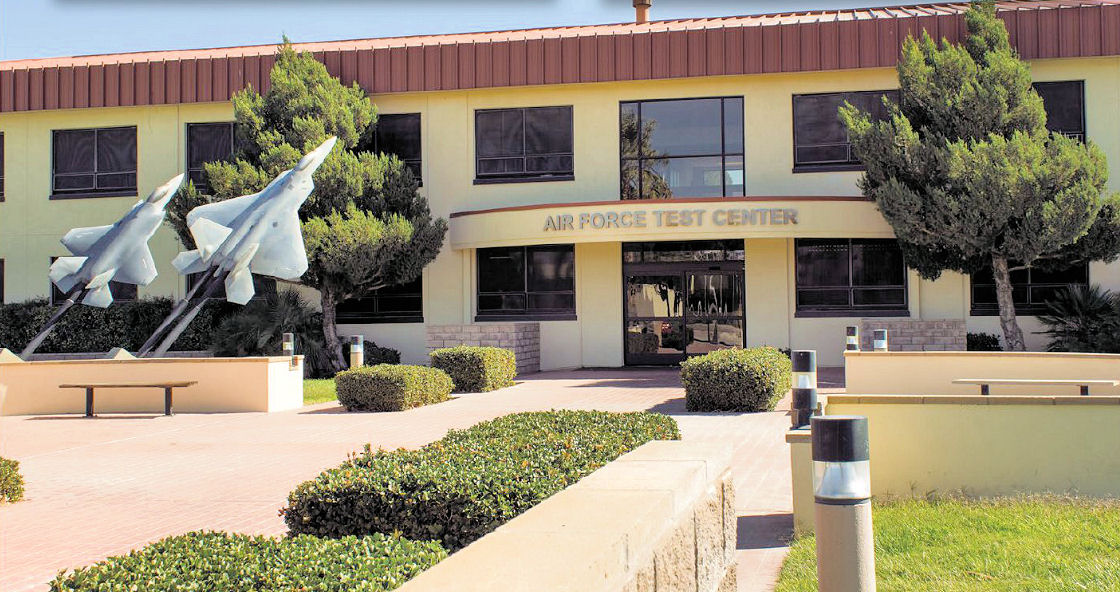
Headquarters Building, Air Force Test Center, Edwards AFB

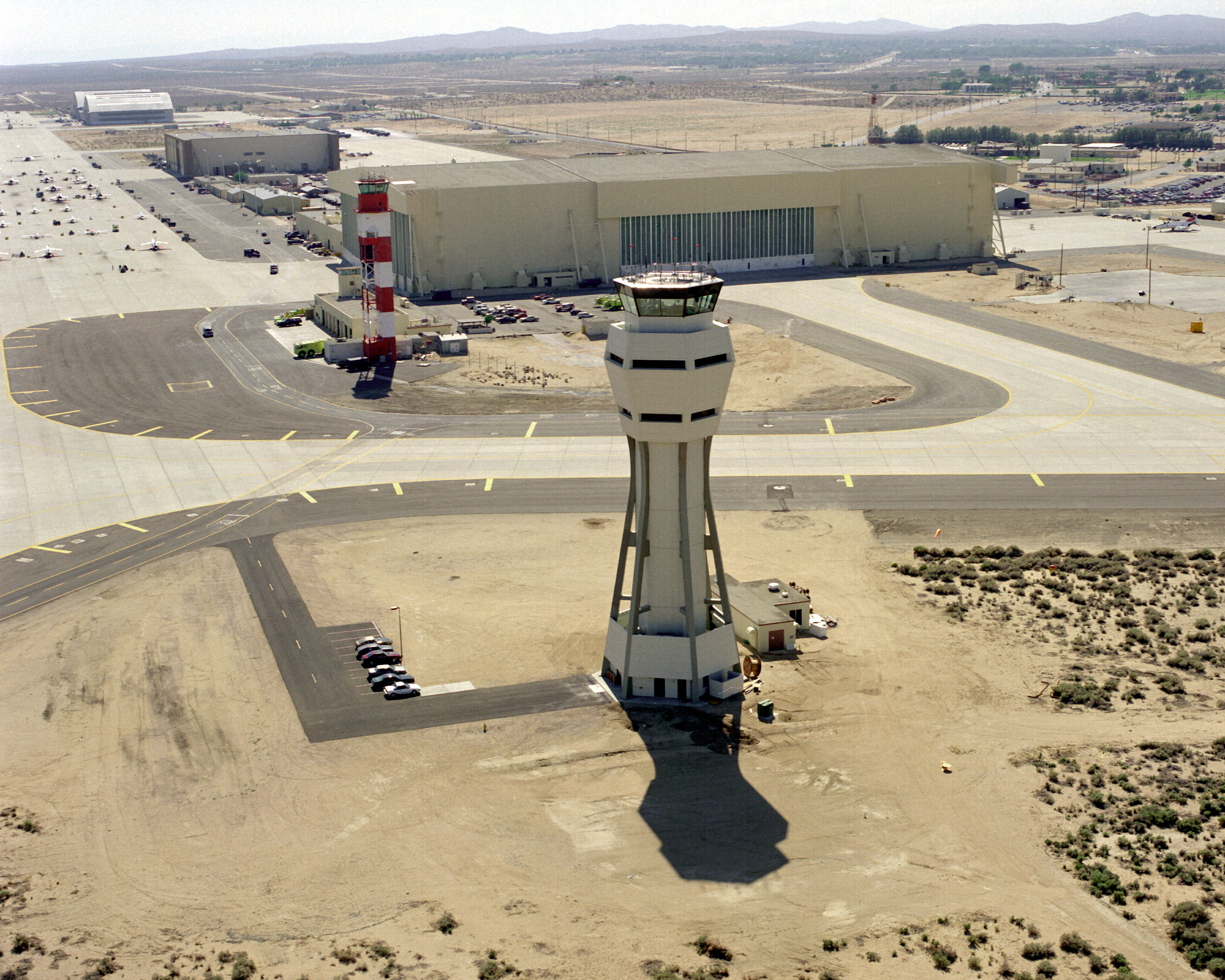
Aerial view of the new control tower with the old tower in the background

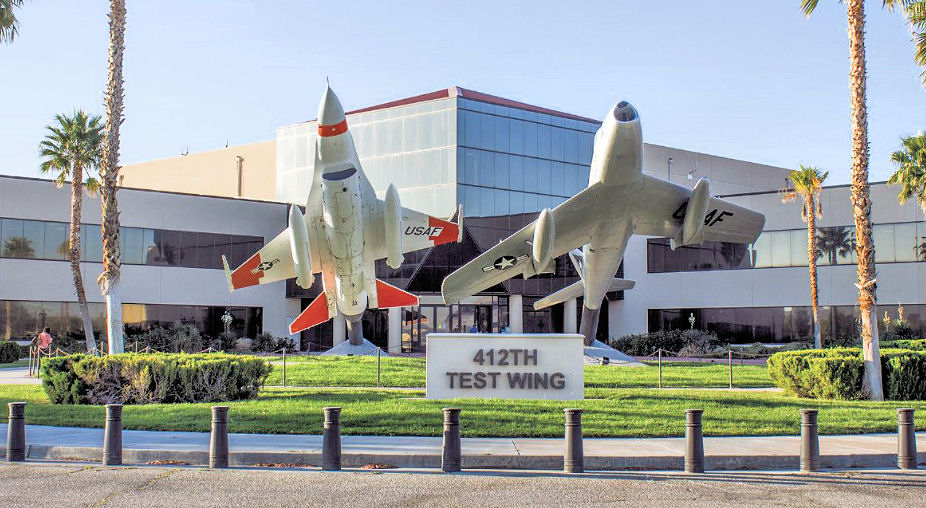
Headquarters, 412th Test Wing

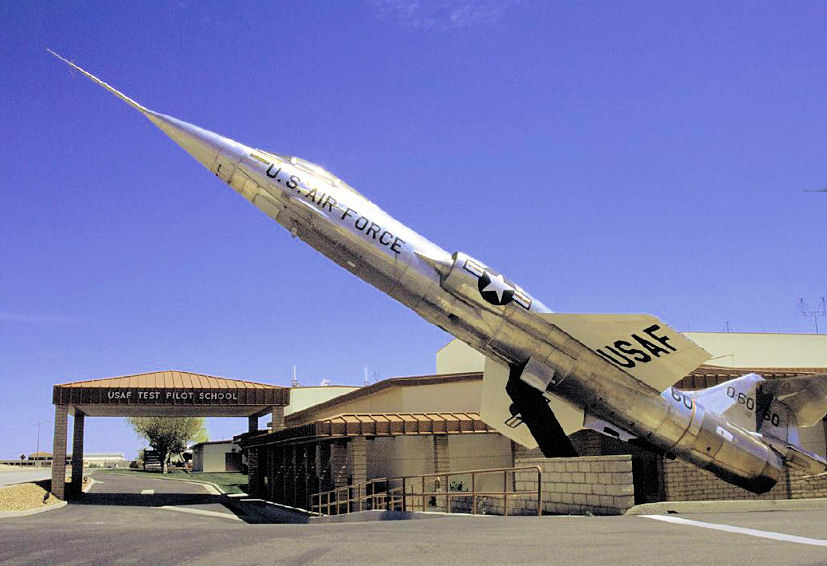
Headquarters, USAF Test Pilot School

==== 412th Test Wing ====
The 412th Test Wing plans, conducts, analyzes, and reports on all flight and ground testing of aircraft, weapons, software and components as well as modeling and simulation for the U.S. Air Force. The Wing also oversees the base's day-to-day operations and provides support for the military, federal civilian, and contract personnel assigned to Edwards AFB. Planes assigned to the 412th carry the tail code ED.

- U.S. Air Force Test Pilot School: Part of the 412th Test Wing, USAF TPS is where the Air Force's top pilots, navigators and engineers learn how to conduct flight tests and generate the data needed to carry out test missions. The comprehensive curriculum of Test Pilot School is fundamental to the success of flight tests and evaluations.
- 412th Operations Group: The 412th OG flies an average of 90 aircraft with upwards of 30 aircraft designs. It performs an annual average of more than 7,400 missions, including more than 1,900 test missions. Its squadrons include:
  - 411th Flight Test Squadron: (F-22)
  - 416th Flight Test Squadron: (F-16)
  - 419th Flight Test Squadron: (B-52H, B-1, B-2)
  - 445th Flight Test Squadron: (Initial Flight Test Operations, T-38)
  - 461st Flight Test Squadron: (F-35 Joint Strike Fighter)
  - 412th Flight Test Squadron: (C-135C Speckled Trout)
  - 418th Flight Test Squadron: (C-130 and special operations variants; CV-22; KC-135 and special variants; C-17A)
  - 452d Flight Test Squadron: (RQ-4)
- 412th Test Management Division
- 412th Test Management Group
- 412th Civil Engineer Division
- 412th Maintenance Group
- 412th Medical Group
- 412th Mission Support Group
- 412th Electronic Warfare Group
- 412th Test Engineering Group

The Test Engineering and Electronic Warfare groups provide the central components in conducting the Test and Evaluation mission of the 412 TW. They provide the tools, talent and equipment for the core disciplines of aircraft structures, propulsion, avionics and electronic warfare evaluation of the latest weapon system technologies. They also host the core facilities that enable flight test and ground test—the Range Division, Benefield Anechoic Facility, Integrated Flight Avionics Systems Test Facility and the Air Force Electronic Warfare Evaluation Simulator. The Project and Resource Management Divisions provide the foundation for the successful program management of test missions.

=== Associate units ===
There are a vast array of organizations at Edwards that do not fall under the 412th Test Wing. They are known as Associate Units. These units do everything from providing an on-base grocery store to testing state-of-the-art rockets.

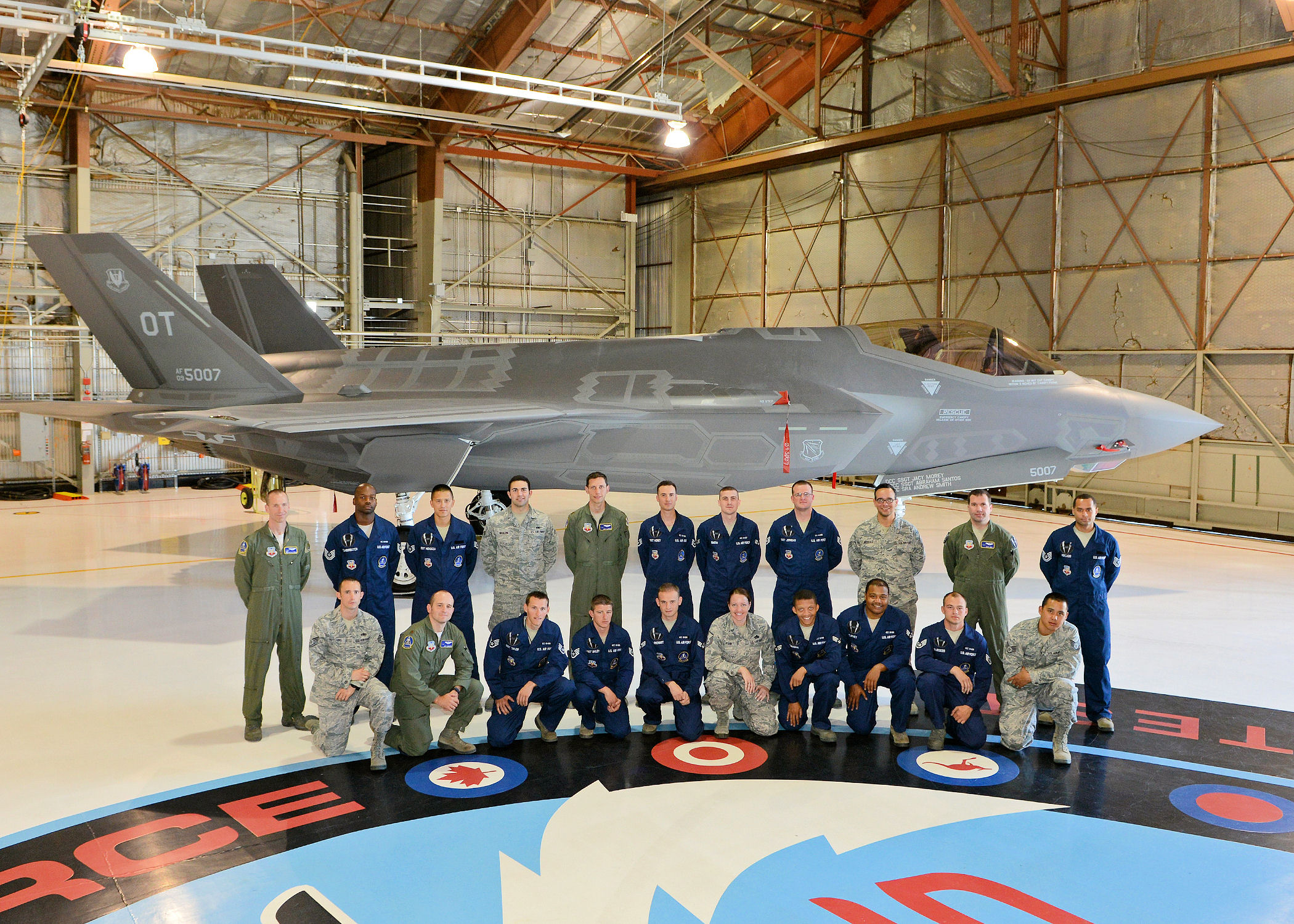
31st Test and Evaluation Squadron Lockheed Martin F-35A Lightning II 09-5007

==== 31st Test and Evaluation Squadron (Tail Code: OT) ====
The 31st Test and Evaluation Squadron provides Air Combat Command personnel to support combined test and evaluation on Air Force weapons systems. Established in 1917, it is one of the oldest units of the United States Air Force. The "Desert Pirates" are part of the 753d Test and Evaluation Group, Nellis AFB, Nevada and the 53d Wing, Eglin AFB, Florida. It also provides the Air Force Operational Test and Evaluation Center, Kirtland AFB, New Mexico, and Air Force Materiel Command, Wright-Patterson AFB, Ohio, with test team members who have an operational perspective to perform test and evaluation on Combat Air Force systems.

The 31st is staffed with a mixture of operations, maintenance and engineering experts who plan and conduct tests, evaluate effectiveness and suitability, and influence system design. The squadron's personnel are integrated into the B-1, B-2, B-52, Global Hawk, MQ-9 and F-35 Joint Strike Fighter programs. Their results and conclusions support Department of Defense acquisition, deployment and employment decisions.

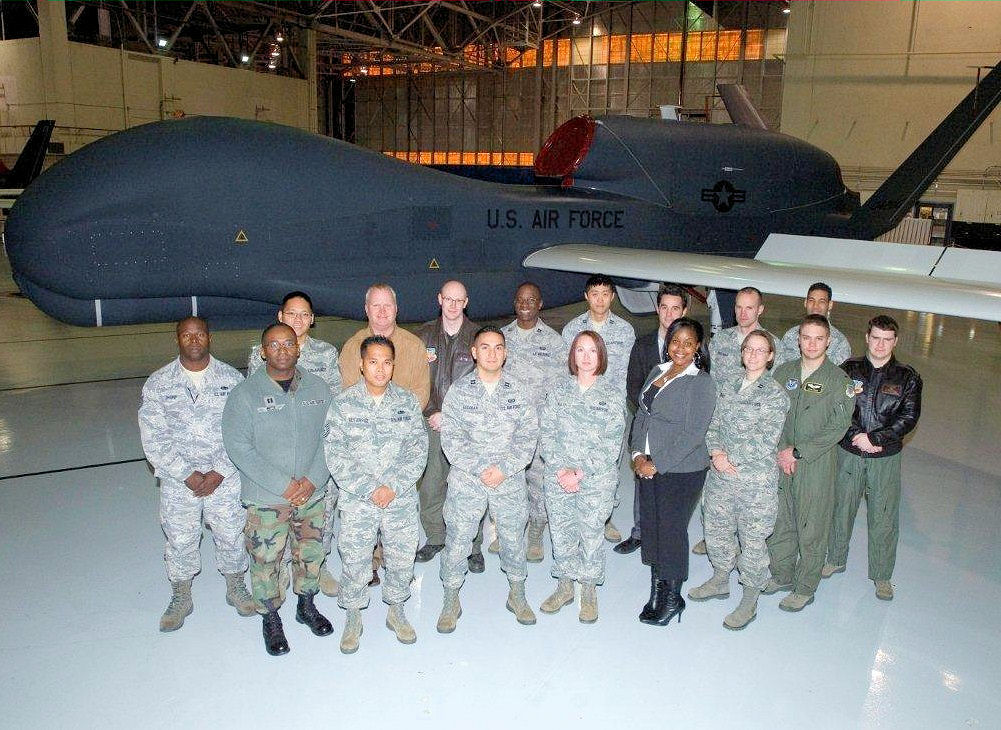
AFOTEC Detachment 5 personnel in front of a RQ-4 Global Hawk

==== Air Force Operational Test and Evaluation Center, Detachment 1 ====
An Air Force Materiel Command named unit assigned to Kirtland AFB, New Mexico, AFOTEC Detachment 1 is responsible for accomplishing Block 2 and 3 Initial Operational Test and Evaluation of the F-35 Lightning II for the US Air Force, United States Navy, United States Marine Corps, United Kingdom Ministry of Defense, and the Royal Netherlands Air Force.

==== Air Force Operational Test and Evaluation Center, Detachment 5 ====
AFOTEC Detachment 5** is responsible for conducting the operational test and evaluation of USAF aircraft and avionics systems. Certification by Detachment 5 is required for new aircraft prior to AFMC full-rate production and combat fielding decisions. Detachment 5 personnel are integrated into the Flight Test Center's combined test squadrons and provide a critical operating perspective during developmental flight testing to help prepare systems for their final operational test and evaluation.
** Note: An AFOTEC Detachment 3 is an unconfirmed geographically separated unit, which may be assigned to a remote facility of Edwards AFB at Groom Lake, Nevada, that may perform similar testing as Detachment 5 on weapons systems not publicly identified. During 1978 and 1979, an AFFTC test pilot and a pair of flight test engineers were engaged in proof-of-concept testing with Lockheed's "low-observable" technology demonstrator, dubbed "Have Blue". The successful conduct of these tests led immediately to the development of the F-117A Nighthawk, the world's first operational stealth fighter.

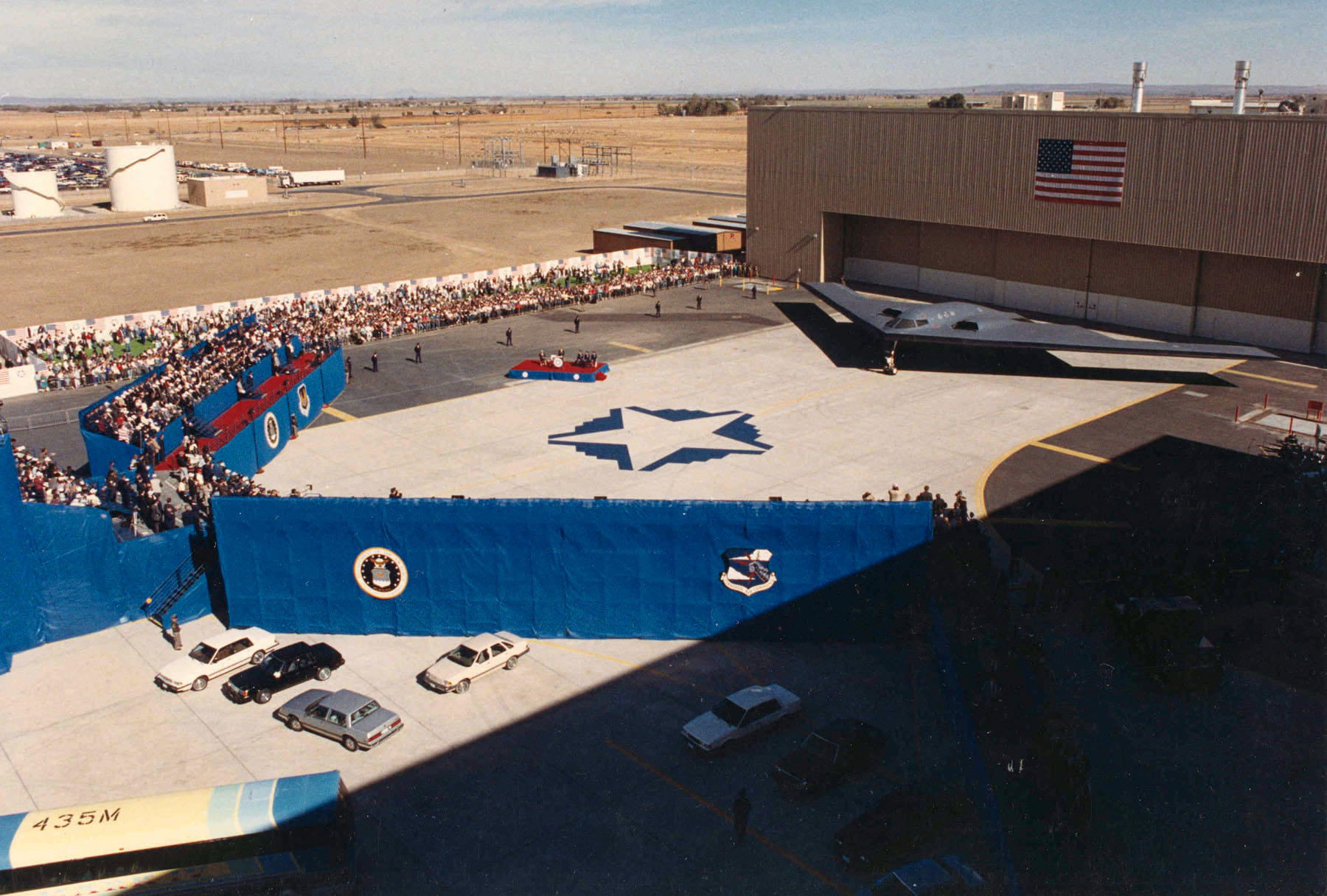
Northrop B-2A roll-out ceremony on 22 November 1988 at USAF Plant 42, Palmdale, California

==== Air Force Plant 42 production flight test installation ====
A remote facility of Edwards AFB, located at Palmdale, California, Plant 42 is a government-owned, contractor-operated facility with proximity to both the concentration of aerospace industry in Los Angeles, and the high-speed corridors and resources of the 412th Test Wing at Edwards. Plant 42 is one of four Air Force plants located throughout the United States and is uniquely situated to fully support the Air Force's newest and most advanced aerospace systems. It provides industrial facilities for production, modification, depot maintenance and flight testing of aerospace systems. It is staffed by a mixture of civilian defense contractors, as well as USAF personnel.

==== NASA Armstrong Flight Research Center ====
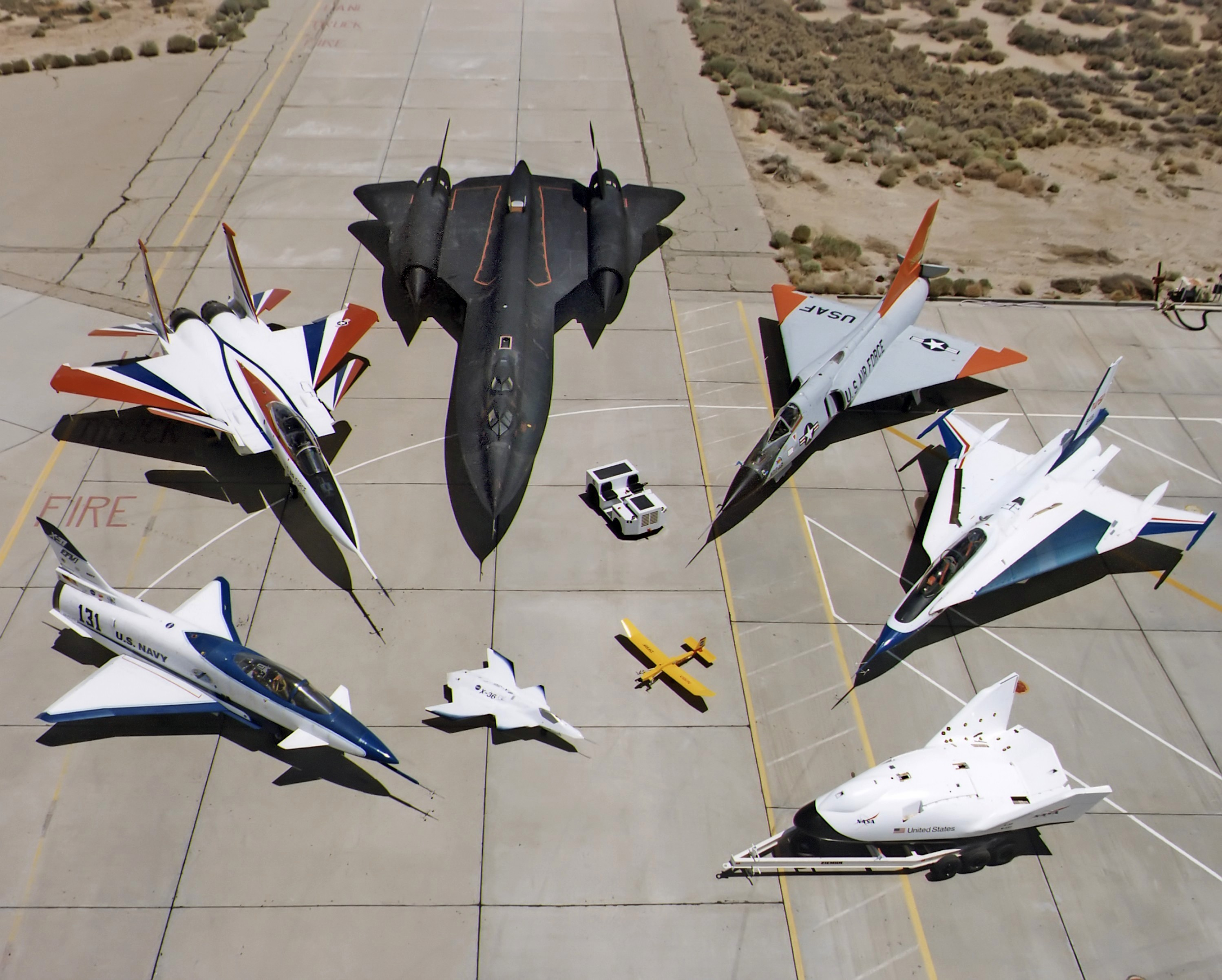
Armstrong Flight Research Center fleet in 1997

Contained inside Edwards Air Force Base is NASA's Armstrong Flight Research Center (AFRC) where modern aircraft research is still active (e.g. the Boeing X-45). The AFRC is home to many of the world's most advanced aircraft. Notable recent research projects include the Controlled Impact Demonstration and the Linear Aerospike SR-71 Experiment. It is chartered to research and test advanced aeronautics, space and related technologies for atmospheric flight operations, and to transfer those technologies to industry and other government agencies. Armstrong supports NASA's Earth science research with a fleet of specialized manned and unmanned environmental science aircraft. Armstrong is also involved in NASA's space science mission by managing and flying the Stratospheric Observatory for Infrared Astronomy. The center is named for Neil A. Armstrong, an American astronaut and the first person to walk on the Moon. Armstrong's history dates back to late 1946, when 13 engineers arrived at what is now Edwards from the NACA Langley Memorial Aeronautical Laboratory in Virginia to support the last supersonic research flights by the X-1 rocket plane in a joint NACA, Army Air Forces and Bell Aircraft program.

==== Air Force Rocket Research Laboratory ====
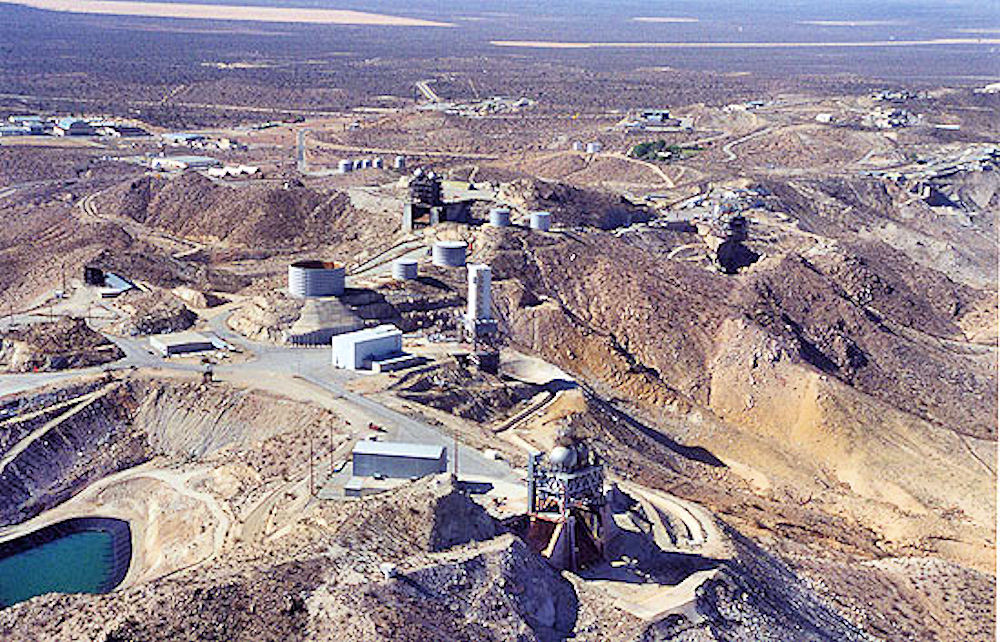
Air Force Rocket Research Laboratory Edwards AFRL site

The Air Force Research Laboratory (AFRL), Propulsion Directorate maintains a rocket engine test facility on and around Leuhman Ridge, just east of Rogers Dry Lake. This facility traces its roots to early Army Air Corps activities. The Edwards Research Site is part of the AFRL Propulsion Directorate, which is headquartered at the Wright Research Site, Wright-Patterson Air Force Base, Ohio.

==== Other units and further details ====
Edwards is also home to several other units from DOD, Air Force, Army, Navy, FAA, USPS and many companies that support the primary mission or the personnel stationed there.

The Main Base is also the home of the Benefield Anechoic Facility (BAF), an electromagnetic and radio frequency testing building. It is also home to the Air Force Flight Test Museum, which has over 15 aircraft on display.

The site has one 6,000 by 150 feet (1,829 m × 46 m) paved runway, 06/24, and is accessed from the lakebed or via a single controlled road.

== Based units ==
Following are flying and notable non-flying units based at Edwards Air Force Base.

Units marked GSU are Geographically Separate Units, which although based at Edwards, are subordinate to a parent unit based at another location.

=== United States Air Force ===
Air Force Materiel Command (AFMC)

- Air Force Test Center
  - Headquarters Air Force Test Center
  - 412th Test Wing (host wing)
    - 412th Comptroller Squadron
    - 412th Operations Group
      - 411th Flight Test Squadron – F-22A Raptor
      - 412th Operations Support Squadron
      - 416th Flight Test Squadron – F-16C/D Fighting Falcon, T-38C Talon
      - 418th Flight Test Squadron – C-17A Globemaster III, C-130 Hercules, CV-22 Osprey, KC-46 Pegasus, KC-135R Stratotanker
      - 419th Flight Test Squadron – B-1B Lancer, B-2A Spirit, B-52H Stratofortress, C-12C Huron
      - 452d Flight Test Squadron – RQ-4B Global Hawk
      - 461st Flight Test Squadron – F-35A Lightning II
    - 412th Civil Engineer Group
      - Asset Management Branch
      - Environmental Management Branch
      - Explosive Ordnance Disposal Branch
      - Fire Protection Branch
      - Operations Branch
      - Programs Branch
      - Readiness Emergency Management Branch
      - Resources Branch
    - 412th Electronic Warfare Group
      - 771st Test Squadron
      - 772nd Test Squadron
      - Business Division
      - Electronic Warfare Range Division
      - Project Development Division
      - Site Support Division
    - 412th Maintenance Group
      - 412th Aircraft Instrumentation Test Squadron
      - 412th Aircraft Maintenance Squadron
      - 412th Logistics Test Squadron
      - 412th Maintenance Squadron
      - 912th Aircraft Maintenance Squadron
      - Maintenance Training Division
      - Plans, Programs, and Operations Division
      - Quality Assurance Division
      - Weapons Standardization Division
    - 412th Medical Group
      - 412th Operational Medical Readiness Squadron
      - 412th Healthcare Operations Squadron
    - 412th Mission Support Group
      - 412th Communications Squadron
      - 412th Force Support Squadron
      - 412th Security Forces Squadron
      - Logistics Readiness Squadron
    - 412th Test Engineering Group
      - 412th Range Squadron
      - 773rd Test Squadron
      - 775th Test Squadron
      - 812th Test Squadron
      - Test Instrumentation Division
    - 412th Test Management Division
      - Project Management
      - Resource, Planning & Analysis
      - Special Projects Branch
    - U.S. Air Force Test Pilot School – NF-16D Fighting Falcon
- Air Force Research Laboratory
  - Propulsion Directorate
    - Air Force Rocket Research Laboratory

Air Combat Command (ACC)

- US Air Force Warfare Center
  - 53rd Wing
    - 53rd Test and Evaluation Group
      - 31st Test and Evaluation Squadron (GSU) – B-1B Lancer, B-2A Spirit, B-52H Stratofortress, F-22A Raptor, F-35A Lightning II, RQ-4B Global Hawk

Direct Reporting Units (DRU)

- Air Force Operational Test and Evaluation Center
  - Detachment 1 (GSU)
  - Detachment 5 (GSU)

=== United States Navy ===
Operational Test and Evaluation Force

- Aviation Warfare
  - VX-9
    - VX-9 Detachment Edwards (GSU) – F-35C Lightning II

=== NASA ===
- Armstrong Flight Research Center – Beech 200 Super King Air, C-20A (UAVSAR), F-15B/D Eagle, F/A-18 Hornet, Gulfstream III, RQ-4 Global Hawk, T-34C Talon, X-57 Maxwell

=== National Geospatial-Intelligence Agency ===
Geodetic Surveys Division

- Edwards Geodetic Surveys Branch

=== Royal Air Force ===
- No. 17 Squadron – F-35B Lightning II

=== Royal Netherlands Air Force ===
- 323 Squadron – F-35A Lightning II

== Infrastructure and facilities ==
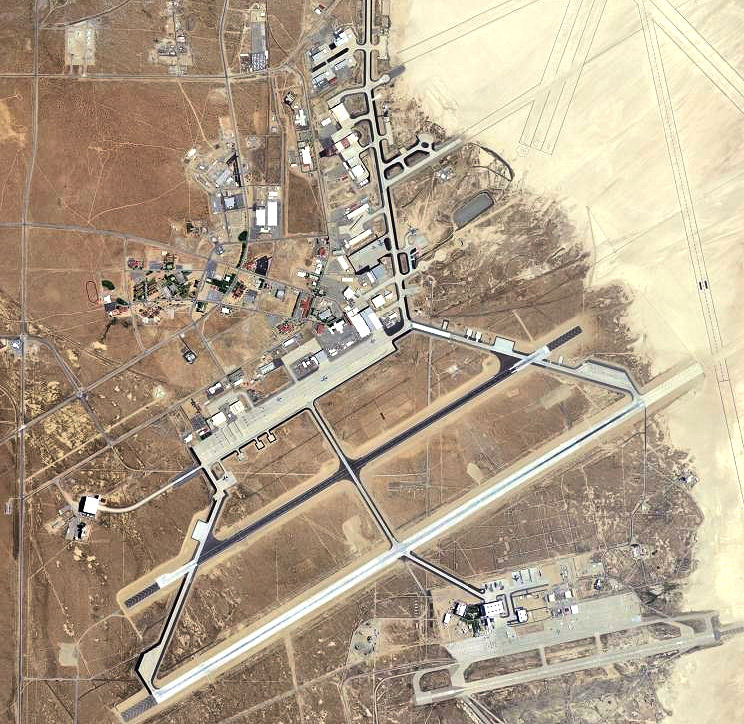
Satellite image of the main site, with Edwards Air Force Auxiliary Base South at the bottom right of the image and Rogers Dry Lake at the top right

The base is next to Rogers Dry Lake, an endorheic desert salt pan which has a hard dry lake surface that provides a natural extension to Edwards' runways. This large landing area, combined with excellent year-round weather, makes the base good for flight testing. The lake is a National Historic Landmark. The base hosts half of the Edwards & Sanborn Solar and Energy Storage Project, with 875 megawatts of solar power and 3,287 megawatt-hours of battery storage. The base receives $75m during 35 years from the plant.

As a military airbase, civilian access is severely restricted. There are three lighted, paved runways:

- 05R/23L is 15,024 ft × 300 ft (4,579 m × 91 m), and an extra 9,588 ft (2,922 m) of lakebed runway is available at its northerly end. It is equipped with arresting systems approximately 1,500 ft (460 m) from each end.
- 05L/23R is 12,000 ft × 200 ft (3,658 m × 61 m) and was constructed to temporarily replace 04R/22L while it was being renovated in 2008.
- 07/25 is 8,000 ft × 50 ft (2,438 m × 15 m) (this runway is technically part of the South Base) and an extra 10,158 ft × 210 ft (3,100 m × 64 m) of lakebed runway is available at its easterly end.

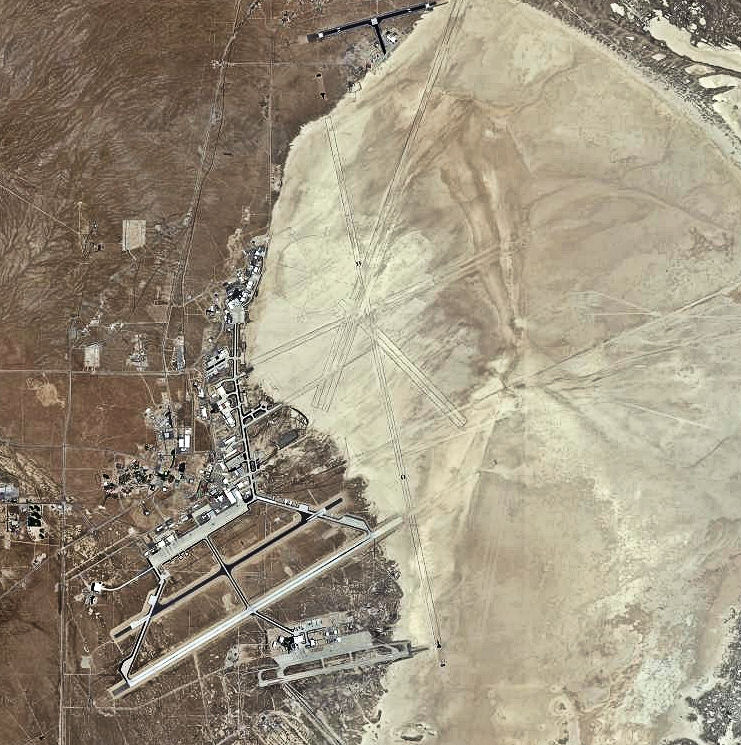
Rogers Dry Lake with Edwards AFB and Auxiliary Base South in the bottom left and Auxiliary Base North at the top of the image

There are 13 other official runways on the Rogers lakebed:

- 17/35 is 39,097 ft × 900 ft (11,917 m × 274 m). Imagery from the 1990s show an extension another 7,500 ft (2,300 m) to the north, including a visual cue and centerline markings that extend about 15,000 ft (4,600 m) down the currently declared portion of the runway. In 2022 Google Maps imagery, the southern Runway 35 indicator is still outlined and clearly visible. The only other remains are a faint outline along the length, and the very eroded northern Runway 17 indicator.
- 05L/23R is 22,175 ft × 300 ft (6,759 m × 91 m)
- 05R/23L is 14,999 ft × 300 ft (4,572 m × 91 m) and is next to 05L/23R at the 23L (easterly) end.
- 06/24 is 7,050 ft × 300 ft (2,149 m × 91 m). Not to be confused with the south base 06/24 paved runway (which also extends onto the lakebed), or the north base 06/24 paved runway.
- 07/25 is 23,100 ft × 300 ft (7,041 m × 91 m)
- 09/27 is 9,991 ft × 300 ft (3,045 m × 91 m)
- 12/30 is 9,235 ft × 600 ft (2,815 m × 183 m). It is actually marked as two adjacent 300 ft (91 m)-wide runways (L and R). Runway 30 rolls out onto the compass rose, so its corresponding, unmarked, runway 12 is never used.
- 15/33 is 29,487 ft × 300 ft (8,988 m × 91 m)
- 18/36 is 23,086 ft × 900 ft (7,037 m × 274 m). It is actually marked as three adjacent 300 ft (91 m)-wide runways (L, C, and R).

The Rosamond lakebed has two runways painted on it:

- 02/20 is 21,044 ft (6,414 m) long
- 11/29 is 20,998 ft (6,400 m) long

== Previous names ==
- Muroc Lake Bombing and Gunnery Range, September 1933
- Army Air Base, Muroc Lake, 23 July 1942
- Army Air Base, Muroc, 2 September 1942
- Muroc Army Airfield, 8 November 1943
- Muroc Air Force Base, 12 February 1948 – 5 December 1949

== Major commands to which assigned ==
- Ninth Corps Area, United States Army, September 1933 – 16 January 1941

Chief of the Air Corps, September 1933 – 1 March 1935
General Headquarters Air Force (GHQAF), 1 March 1935 – 16 January 1941

- Southwest Air District, 16 January 1941 – 11 March 1941
- Fourth Air Force, 31 March 1941 – 17 July 1944
- AAF Materiel and Services Command, 17 July 1944 – 31 August 1944
- AAF Technical Service Command, 31 August 1944 – 6 June 1945
- Continental Air Forces, 6 June 1945 – 16 October 1945
- Air Technical Service Command, 16 October 1945 – 9 March 1946
- Air Materiel Command, 9 March 1946 – 2 April 1951
- Air Research and Development Command, 2 April 1951 – 1 April 1961
- Air Force Systems Command, 1 April 1961 – 1 July 1992
- Air Force Materiel Command, 1 July 1992–present

== Major units assigned ==
- 41st Bombardment Group, 11 December 1941 – 25 February 1942
- 47th Bombardment Group, 11 December 1941 – 17 February 1942
- 30th Bombardment Group, 24 December 1941 – 11 March 1942
- 323d Base HQ and Air Base Squadron, 1 May 1942 – 1 April 1944
- 78th Pursuit Group, 30 April – 9 May 1942
- 81st Fighter Group, 28 June – 9 May 1942
- 360th Fighter Group, 15 January – 14 April 1943
- 382d Bombardment Group, 6 December 1943 – 31 March 1944
- 412th Fighter Group, 29 November 1943 – 1 June 1944
- 421st AAF Base Unit, 1 April 1944 – 16 October 1945
- 4144th AAF Base Unit, 16 October 1945 – 28 August 1948
- 3076th Air Base Group, 20 May 1949 – 25 June 1951
- 3077th Experimental Group, 20 May 1949 – 25 June 1951
- 730th AAF Base Unit (Flight Test), 11 March 1944 – 25 June 1951

Re-designated: 4144th AAF Base Unit (Flight Test)
Re-designated: 2759th AF Base Unit (Flight Test)
Re-designated: 2759th Experimental Wing

- Replaced by: Air Force Flight Test Center, 25 June 1951

Re-designated: Air Force Test Center, 13 July 2012–present

- 3076th Air Base Group, 20 May 1949

Re-designated 6510th Air Base Group, 25 June 1951 – 1 October 1994

- 95th Air Base Wing, 1 October 1994 – 13 July 2012
- 6510th Test Wing, 1 March 1978

Consolidated with 412th Test Wing, 2 October 1992–present

== Geography ==
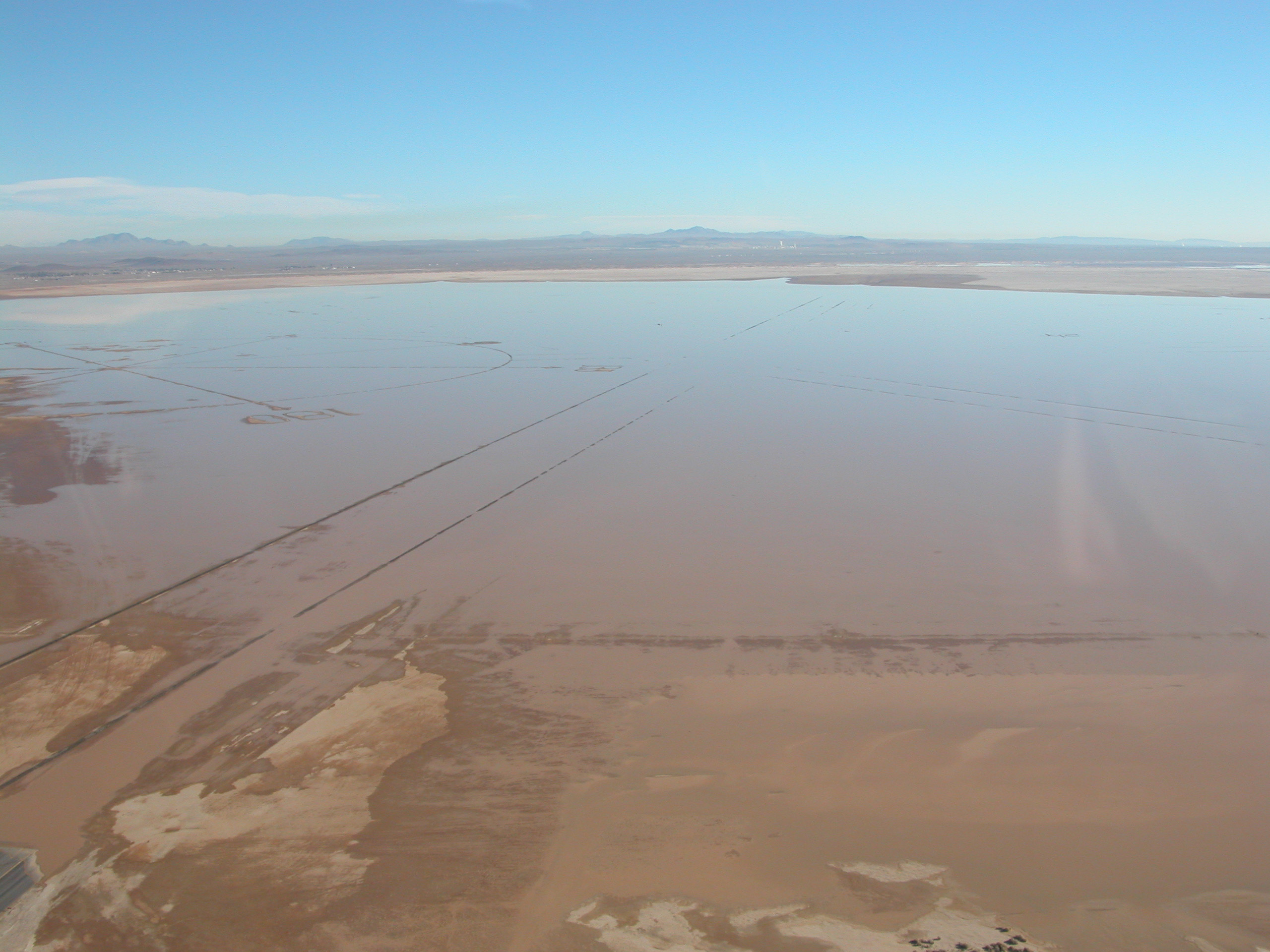
The Rogers Lake is not always dry. During the brief rainy season in the Mojave Desert, water fills the lakebed. The compass rose can be seen on the left.

The largest features of the 470 square miles (1,200 km^{2}) that make up Edwards AFB are the Rogers Lake and Rosamond Lake dry lakes. These have served as emergency and scheduled landing sites for many aerospace projects including the Bell X-1, Lockheed U-2, Lockheed SR-71 Blackbird, and the Space Shuttle. The lakebeds have black lines painted on them to mark seven official "runways". Also painted on the dry lake beds near Dryden is the world's largest compass rose: 2,000-foot (610 m) radius, 4,000 feet (0.76 mi; 1.22 km) in diameter. The Edwards AFB compass rose's magnetic declination to true north is measured by Google Earth's distance/direction measurement tool as inclined to magnetic north with a 15.3 degrees east variance of true north, as opposed to the current variance of 11.5 degrees east (2025). This is consistent with a calculated magnetic variance of 15.5 degrees east at this location at the time of the compass rose's construction in 1956. The larger lake bed, Rogers, encompasses 44 square miles (110 km^{2}) of desert. Because of Rogers' history in the space program, it was declared a National Historic Landmark.

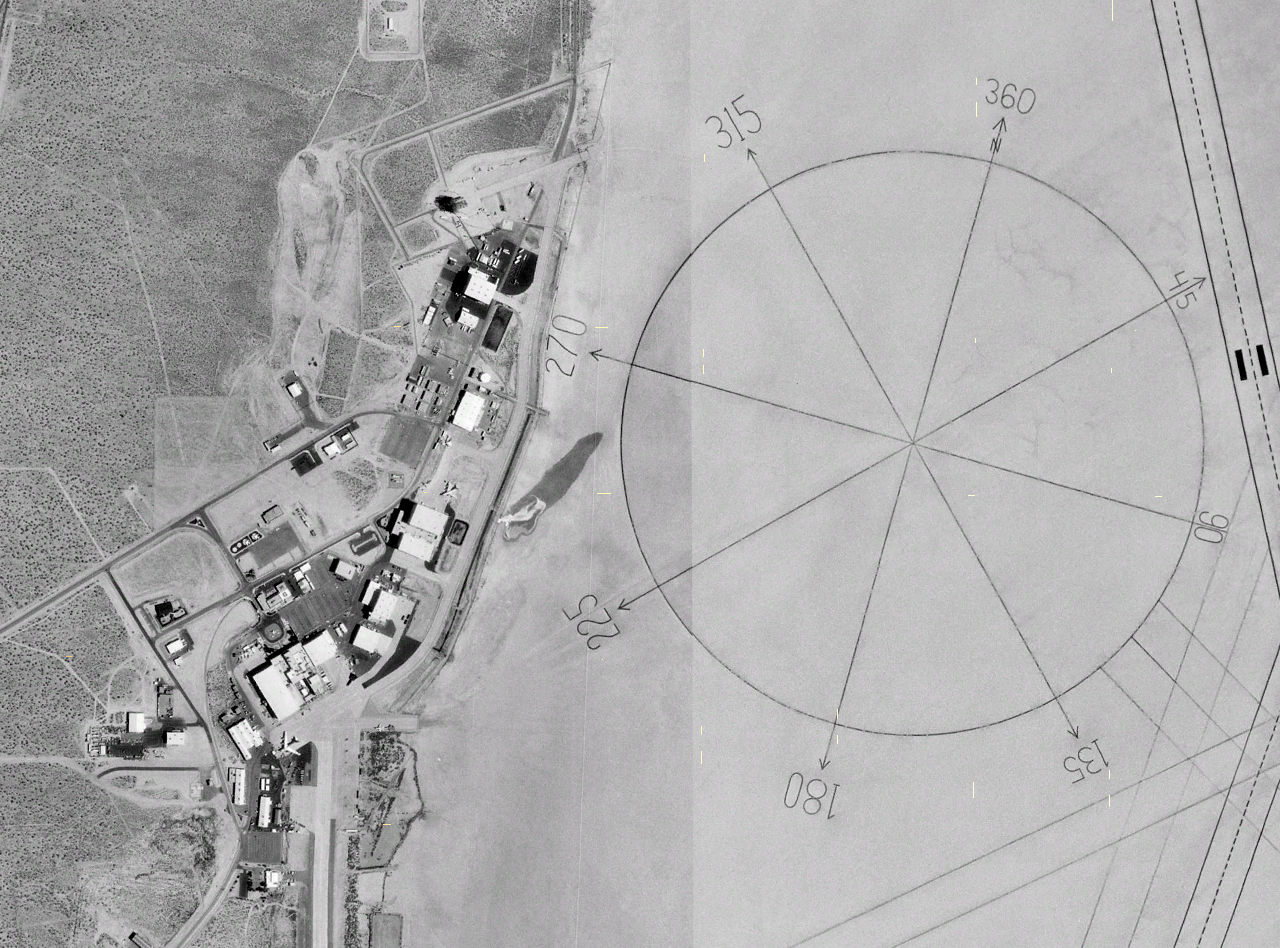
The world's largest compass rose is painted on the lake bed beside NASA's Armstrong Flight Research Center.

The Rosamond dry lake bed encompasses 21 square miles (54 km^{2}) and is also used for emergency landings and other flight research roles. By August, the lake bed is dry and rough from the weather and from high-performance aircraft performing landings. Both lake beds are some of the lowest points in the Antelope Valley and they can collect large amounts of precipitation. Desert winds whip this seasonal water around on the lake beds and the process polishes them, yielding a new, extremely flat surface; the Rosamond lake bed was measured to have an altitude deviation of 18 inches (460 mm) over a 30,000-foot (9,100 m) length; that's about 1 millimetre (0.039 in) altitude deviation over every 20 metres (66 ft) of length.

The census-designated place encompasses an area of 44.38 square kilometres (17.1 sq mi) of which 0.173 hectares (0.43 acres) is water.

=== Environmental concerns ===
There are several protected and threatened species living in Edwards, the most notable being the desert tortoise (Gopherus agassizii). It is illegal to touch, harass or otherwise harm a desert tortoise. Another notable species is Yucca brevifolia: the taller members of this species are called Joshua trees.

== Demographics ==
Edwards AFB
- Census-designated place
- Location in Kern County and the state of California

- Location within California Location within the United States
- Country: United States
- State: California
- County: Kern

Area
  - Total: 17.135 sq mi (44.38 km^{2})
  - Land: 17.134 sq mi (44.38 km^{2})
  - Water: 0.001 sq mi (0.0026 km^{2})
- Elevation: 2,349 ft (716 m)

Population (2020)
  - Total: 2,135
  - Density: 124.6/sq mi (48.11/km^{2})
- Time zone: UTC-8 (Pacific)
  - Summer (DST): UTC-7 (PDT)
- GNIS feature ID: 2408048

The United States Census Bureau has designated Edwards Air Force Base as a separate census-designated place (CDP) for statistical purposes, covering the base's residential population. It was first listed as an unincorporated community in the 1970 U.S. census; and as a CDP in the 1980 U.S. census. Per the 2020 U.S. census, the population was 2,135.

Historical population
Census	Pop.	Note	%±
1970	10,331		—
1980	8,554		−17.2%
1990	7,423		−13.2%
2000	5,909		−20.4%
2010	2,063		−65.1%
2020	2,135		3.5%
U.S. Decennial Census; 1860–1870 1880-1890; 1900 1910 1920; 1930 1940 1950; 1960 1970 1980; 1990 2000 2010; 2020

Edwards AFB CDP, California – Racial and ethnic composition Note: the US Census treats Hispanic/Latino as an ethnic category. This table excludes Latinos from the racial categories and assigns them to a separate category. Hispanics/Latinos may be of any race.
Race / Ethnicity (NH = Non-Hispanic)	Pop 2000	Pop 2010	Pop 2020	% 2000	% 2010	% 2020
White alone (NH)	4,036	1,325	1,210	68.30%	64.23%	56.67%
Black or African American alone (NH)	596	150	198	10.09%	7.27%	9.27%
Native American or Alaska Native alone (NH)	31	15	4	0.52%	0.73%	0.19%
Asian alone (NH)	254	91	88	4.30%	4.41%	4.12%
Native Hawaiian or Pacific Islander alone (NH)	30	7	23	0.51%	0.34%	1.08%
Other race alone (NH)	13	5	14	0.22%	0.24%	0.66%
Mixed race or Multiracial (NH)	259	115	177	4.38%	5.57%	8.29%
Hispanic or Latino (any race)	690	355	421	11.68%	17.21%	19.72%
Total	5,909	2,063	2,135	100.00%	100.00%	100.00%

=== 2020 census ===
The 2020 United States census reported that Edwards AFB had a population of 2,135. The population density was 124.6 inhabitants per square mile (48.1/km^{2}). The racial makeup of Edwards AFB was 63.6% White, 10.7% African American, 0.6% Native American, 4.4% Asian, 1.2% Pacific Islander, 3.9% from other races, and 15.6% from two or more races. Hispanic or Latino of any race were 19.7% of the population.

The census reported that 94.6% of the population lived in households, 5.4% lived in non-institutionalized group quarters, and no one was institutionalized.

There were 589 households, out of which 71.8% included children under the age of 18, 90.0% were married-couple households, 0.7% were cohabiting couple households, 4.4% had a female householder with no partner present, and 4.9% had a male householder with no partner present. 3.9% of households were one person, and 0.3% were one person aged 65 or older. The average household size was 3.43. There were 560 families (95.1% of all households).

The age distribution was 38.9% under the age of 18, 12.4% aged 18 to 24, 44.6% aged 25 to 44, 3.2% aged 45 to 64, and 0.8% who were 65 years of age or older. The median age was 24.4 years. For every 100 females, there were 104.3 males.

There were 684 housing units at an average density of 39.9 units per square mile (15.4 units/km^{2}), of which 589 (86.1%) were occupied. Of these, 1.0% were owner-occupied, and 99.0% were occupied by renters.

In 2023, the US Census Bureau estimated that the median household income was $92,120, and the per capita income was $30,199. About 2.8% of families and 3.2% of the population were below the poverty line.

=== 2010 Census ===
The 2010 United States census reported that Edwards AFB had a population of 2,063. The population density was 120.4 inhabitants per square mile (46.5/km^{2}). The racial makeup of Edwards AFB was 1,518 (73.6%) White, 165 (8.0%) Black, 16 (0.8%) Native American, 99 (4.8%) Asian, 10 (0.5%) Pacific Islander, 96 (4.7%) from other races, and 159 (7.7%) from two or more races. Hispanic or Latino people of any race were 355 persons (17.2%).

The Census reported that 1,834 people (88.9% of the population) lived in households, 229 (11.1%) lived in non-institutionalized group quarters, and 0 (0%) were institutionalized.

There were 574 households, out of which 387 (67.4%) had children under the age of 18 living in them, 456 (79.4%) were opposite-sex married couples living together, 33 (5.7%) had a female householder with no husband present, 17 (3.0%) had a male householder with no wife present. There were 1 (0.2%) unmarried opposite-sex partnerships, and 0 (0%) same-sex married couples or partnerships. 68 households (11.8%) were made up of individuals, and 4 (0.7%) had someone living alone who was 65 years of age or older. The average household size was 3.20. There were 506 families (88.2% of all households); the average family size was 3.48.

The population was spread out, with 771 people (37.4%) under the age of 18, 392 people (19.0%) aged 18 to 24, 803 people (38.9%) aged 25 to 44, 87 people (4.2%) aged 45 to 64, and 10 people (0.5%) who were 65 years of age or older. The median age was 23.0 years. For every 100 females, there were 106.5 males. For every 100 females age 18 and over, there were 117.1 males.

There were 785 housing units at an average density of 45.8 per square mile (17.7/km^{2}), of which 8 (1.4%) were owner-occupied, and 566 (98.6%) were occupied by renters. The homeowner vacancy rate was 0%; the rental vacancy rate was 0.2%. 16 people (0.8% of the population) lived in owner-occupied housing units and 1,818 people (88.1%) lived in rental housing units.

== Education ==
Muroc Joint Unified School District operates public K-12 schools on-post for dependent children: William A. Bailey Elementary School (Transitional Kindergarten-Grade 2), Irving L. Branch Elementary School (grades 3-6), and Desert Junior/Senior High School (grades 7-12). The schools are operated under the State of California, and are not a part of the Department of Defense Education Activity (DoDEA).

== State and federal representation ==
In the California State Senate, Edwards AFB is in the 12th senatorial district, represented by Republican Shannon Grove. In the California State Assembly, it is in the 34th Assembly district, represented by Republican Tom Lackey.

In the United States House of Representatives, Edwards AFB is in California's 20th congressional district, represented by Republican Vince Fong.

== See also ==
- Aerospace Walk of Honor – nearby memorial to test pilots who have contributed to aviation and space research & development.
- California World War II Army Airfields
- List of airports in Kern County, California
- List of United States Air Force installations
- Murphy's Law – adage or epigram associated with Edwards AFB

== Bibliography ==
- Collins, Michael (2009). Carrying the Fire: An Astronaut's Journeys. Lindbergh, Charles (foreword). Cooper Square Press. ISBN 9780374531942.
