= Glen Edwards (pilot) =

United States Air Force officer

Glen Walter Edwards
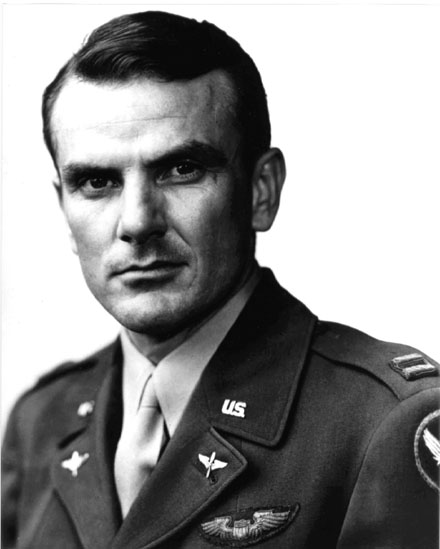
- Born: March 5, 1916; Medicine Hat, Alberta, Canada
- Died: June 5, 1948 (aged 32); California City, California, U.S.
- Burial place: Lincoln Cemetery; Lincoln, California, U.S.
- Military career
- Allegiance: United States of America
- Branch: United States Army Air Forces; United States Air Force
- Service years: 1941–1948
- Rank: Captain
- Conflicts: World War II
- Awards: Distinguished Flying Crosses (4); Air Medal (6)

Glen Walter Edwards (March 5, 1916 – June 5, 1948) was a test pilot for the United States Air Force. He is the namesake of Edwards Air Force Base.

== Early life ==
Edwards was born March 5, 1916, in Medicine Hat, Alberta, Canada, where he lived until 1931. When he was aged 13, his parents Claude Gustin Edwards, a real estate salesman, and Mary Elizabeth (née Briggeman) Edwards moved the family to the US, settling in Lincoln, northeast of Sacramento. He attended Lincoln High School, where he was a member of the Spanish Club and worked on the school newspaper, "El Eco". After graduating from high school in 1936, he attended Placer Junior College in Auburn, California, and graduated from the University of California, Berkeley, with a B.S. degree and from Princeton University with a M.S. degree.

== World War II ==
=== North Africa and southern Italy ===
After graduating with a Bachelor of Science degree in chemical engineering from Berkeley, Edwards enlisted in the U.S. Army Air Forces on July 15, 1941, five months before Pearl Harbor, as an aviation cadet. Upon completion of flight training, he was commissioned as a Second Lieutenant at Luke Field, Arizona, in February 1942. Assigned to the 86th Light Bombardment Squadron of the 47th Bombardment Group, he departed for the North African Theater of Operations (Tunisia) as a flight commander in October 1942. There he led his flight of A-20s on extremely hazardous, low-level missions against German tanks, convoys, troop concentrations, bridges, airfields, and a variety of other tactical targets.

When the Germans broke through the Kasserine Pass in February 1943, his undermanned and undersupplied squadron flew 11 missions in a single day, repeatedly attacking advancing armored columns and blunting their thrust. On one of these missions, Edwards and his crew set a record by completing a combat mission—from takeoff to landing—in just 19 minutes. His squadron received a Distinguished Unit Citation for this action.

During his tours in the North African campaign and the invasion of Sicily, Edwards completed 50 combat missions and was awarded four Distinguished Flying Crosses and six Air Medals.

Returning to the United States in December 1943, he was assigned to the Pilot Standardization Board at Florence Army Air Field, South Carolina, and then, in late 1944, to the Flight Test Division at Wright Field, Ohio. He graduated from the Air Materiel Command Flight Performance School (initial designation of the U.S. Air Force Test Pilot School) (Class 45) there in May 1945 and was assigned to the Bomber Test Operations Section.

== Post war ==
=== The first test flights ===
Although assigned to Wright Field, he spent much of his time at Muroc Army Air Field, in California's high desert, testing a wide variety of experimental prototypes such as Douglas' unconventional pusher-prop light bomber, the XB-42 Mixmaster. On 8 December 1945, he and Lieutenant Colonel Henry E. Warden set a new transcontinental speed record when they flew the XB-42 from Long Beach, California, to Bolling Air Force Base, in Washington, D.C., in 5 hours 17 minutes.

In 1946 he was the principal project pilot for the jet-powered Convair XB-46 prototype bomber. During this period he got his first experience with a flying wing, as he familiarized himself with the flying qualities of the Northrop N-9M, a single-seat, one-third scale mock-up of the giant XB-35 prototype bomber.

His skills as a pilot, engineer and officer were held in such high esteem that his immediate superior, Major Robert Cardenas, recommended him as project pilot for the first attempt to exceed the speed of sound in the Bell X-1. That assignment, however, went to Capt. Chuck Yeager.

=== University ===
Edwards was, instead, selected to be among the first to be sent to Princeton University for graduate study in the aeronautical sciences. The recent war had spawned truly revolutionary advances in aviation technology and it had become apparent to men such as Col. Albert Boyd, the chief of the Flight Test Division, that a new breed of military test pilot—one who combined the talents of a highly skilled pilot with the technical expertise of an engineer—would be required to effectively evaluate increasingly complex aircraft and onboard systems. Thus, when Glen Edwards graduated from Princeton with a Master of Science degree in Aeronautical Engineering in 1947, he represented one of the first of this new breed.

== Death ==
In May 1948, Edwards was selected to join the team of test pilots and engineers at Muroc who were then evaluating the Northrop YB-49, the all-jet version of the flying wing bomber. After his first few flights, he was not impressed, confiding to his diary that it was "the darndest airplane I've ever tried to do anything with. Quite uncontrollable at times." Then, on June 5, 1948, he was flying as co-pilot with Maj. Daniel Forbes when the airplane departed from controlled flight and broke apart in the sky northwest of the base. All five crew members were killed.

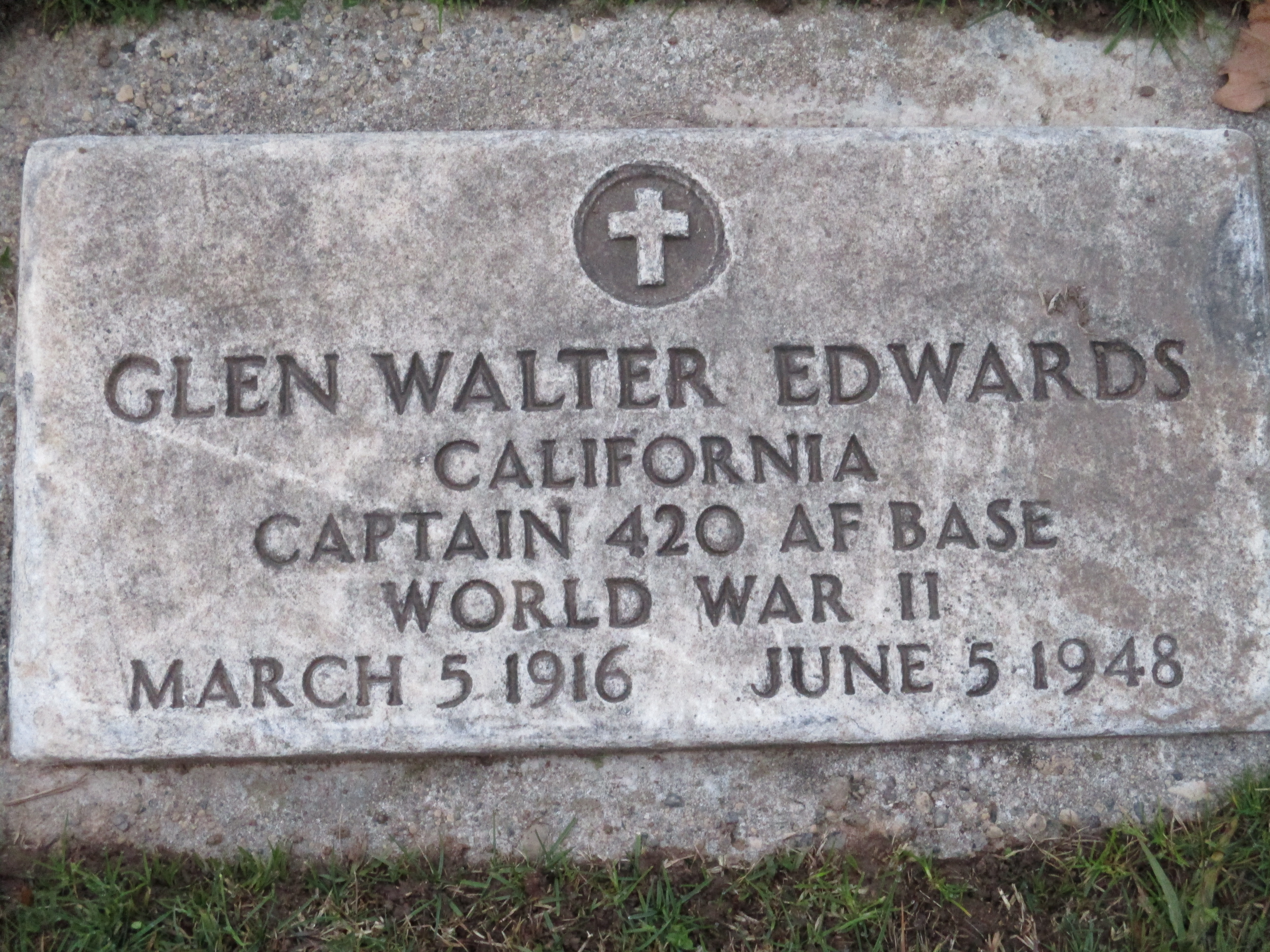
Glen Edwards Grave Lincoln Cemetery

== Tributes ==
One of Col. Boyd's first orders of business, when he assumed command of Muroc in late 1949, was to rename the base in honor of someone who had given his life to the cause of experimental flight research. By tradition, Air Force bases were named after distinguished individuals who were native sons of the state in which a base was located. Boyd could think of no one more deserving than the bright, young, Canadian-born Californian whose promising career had ended in the skies over the western Mojave.

On December 8, 1949, Muroc Air Force Base was redesignated Edwards Air Force Base. During ceremonies on January 27, 1950, a plaque was unveiled, reading: "A pioneer of the Flying Wing in the western skies, with courage and daring unrecognized by himself." It now sits in front of the headquarters of the Air Force Flight Test Center. In 1995, Edwards was inducted into the Aerospace Walk of Honor.

In 2008, the family of Captain Edwards donated his diaries to the Air Force Flight Test Center museum. The diaries describe Edwards' experiences during World War II, from when he joined the Army Air Corps, up to a few days before he died.

There is a middle school in Lincoln, California, named after Edwards.
