= List of B-1 units of the United States Air Force =

This is a list of B-1 units of the United States Air Force by wing, squadron, location, variant, and service dates. During the 1980s, squadrons were transferred regularly to different wings and bases temporarily, and sometimes permanently.

== Active duty ==
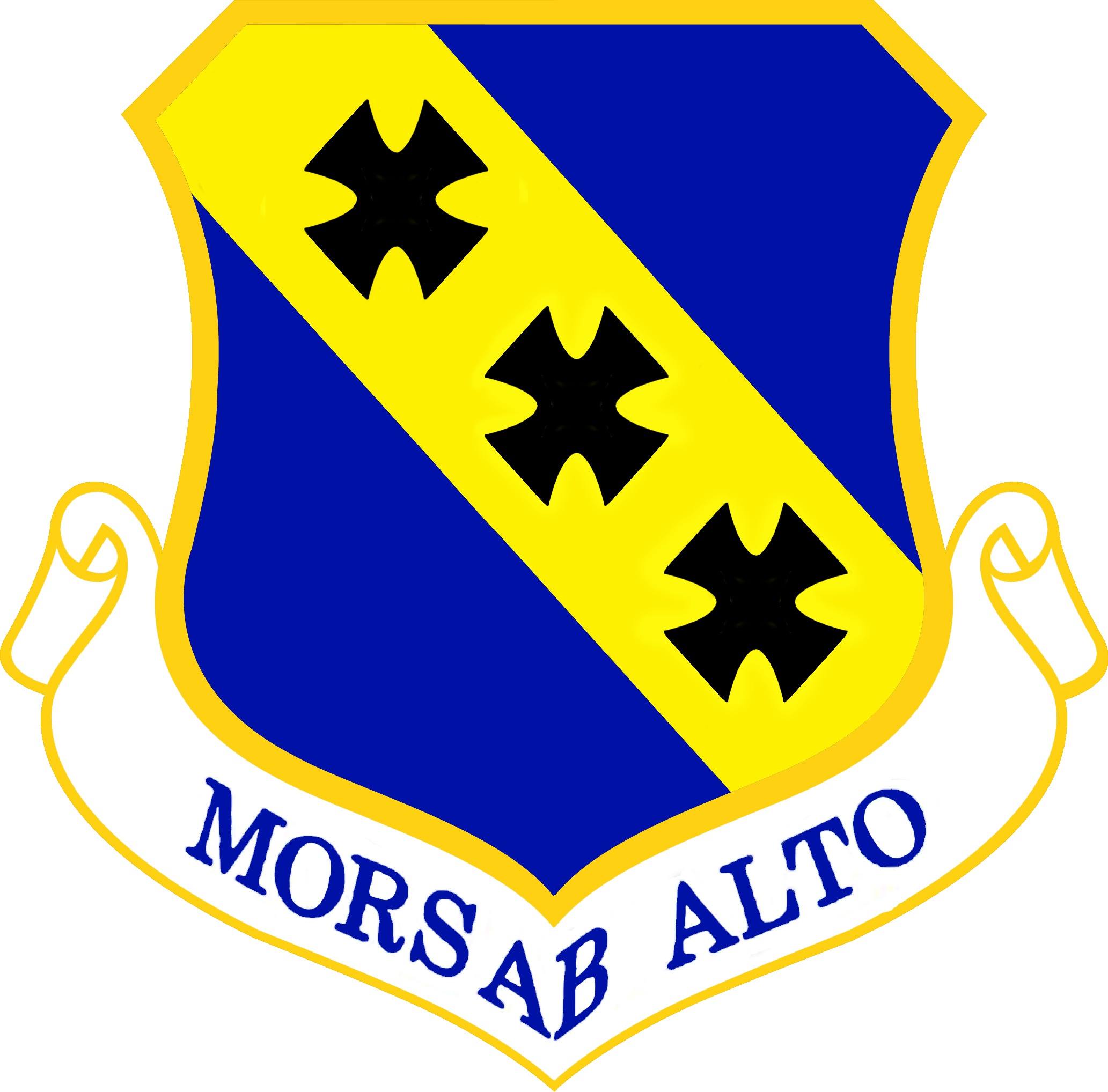
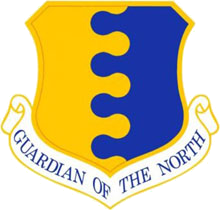
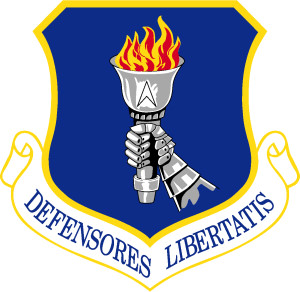
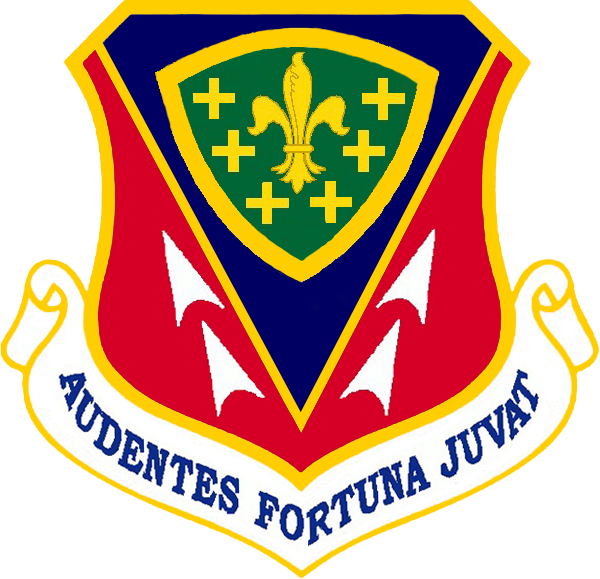
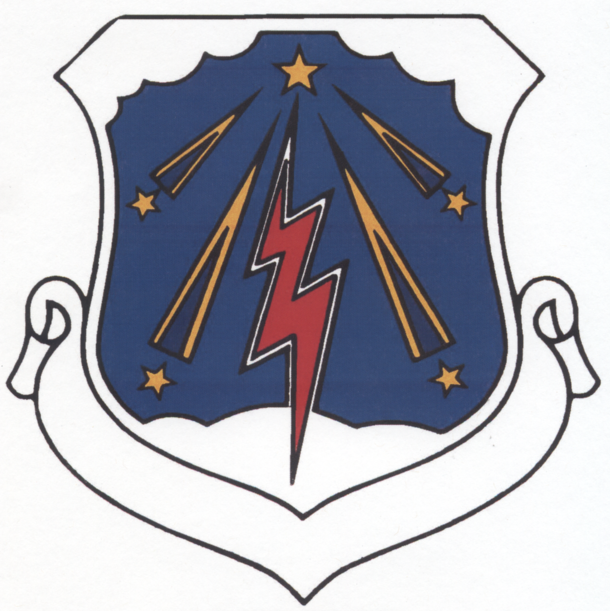
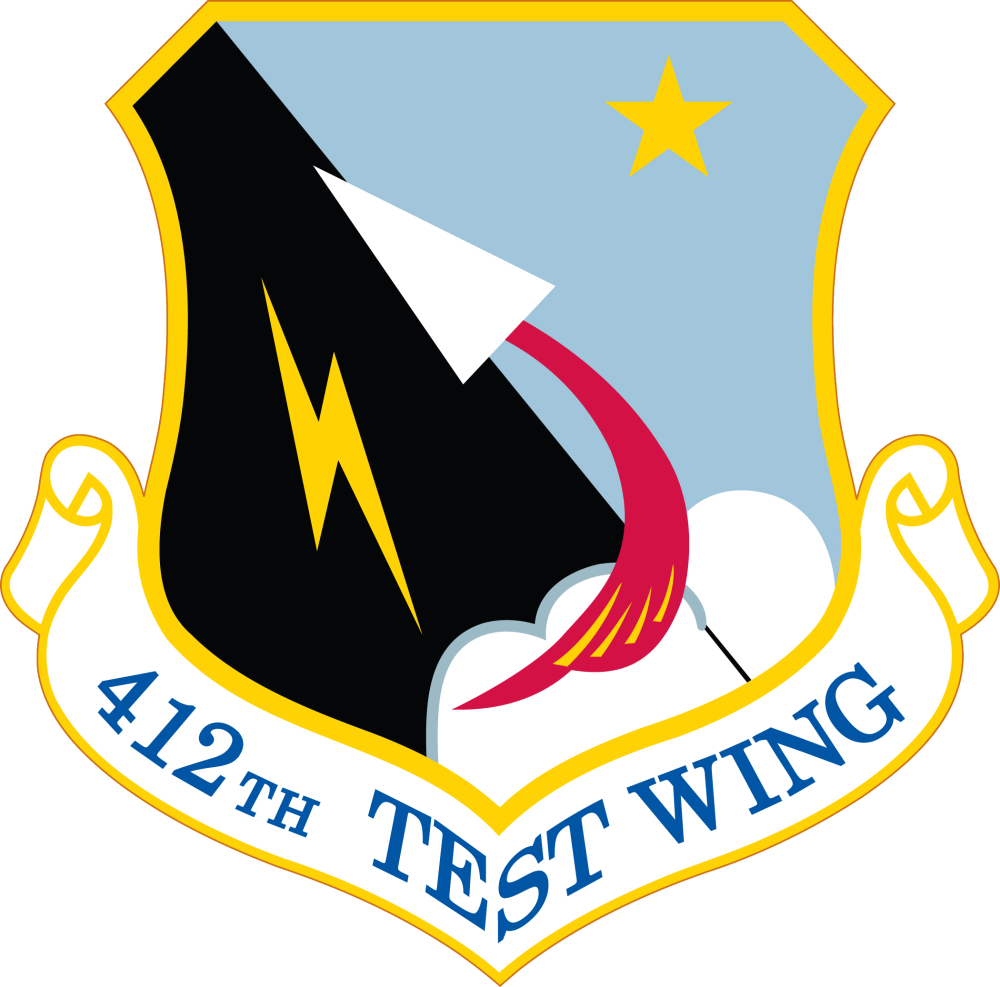
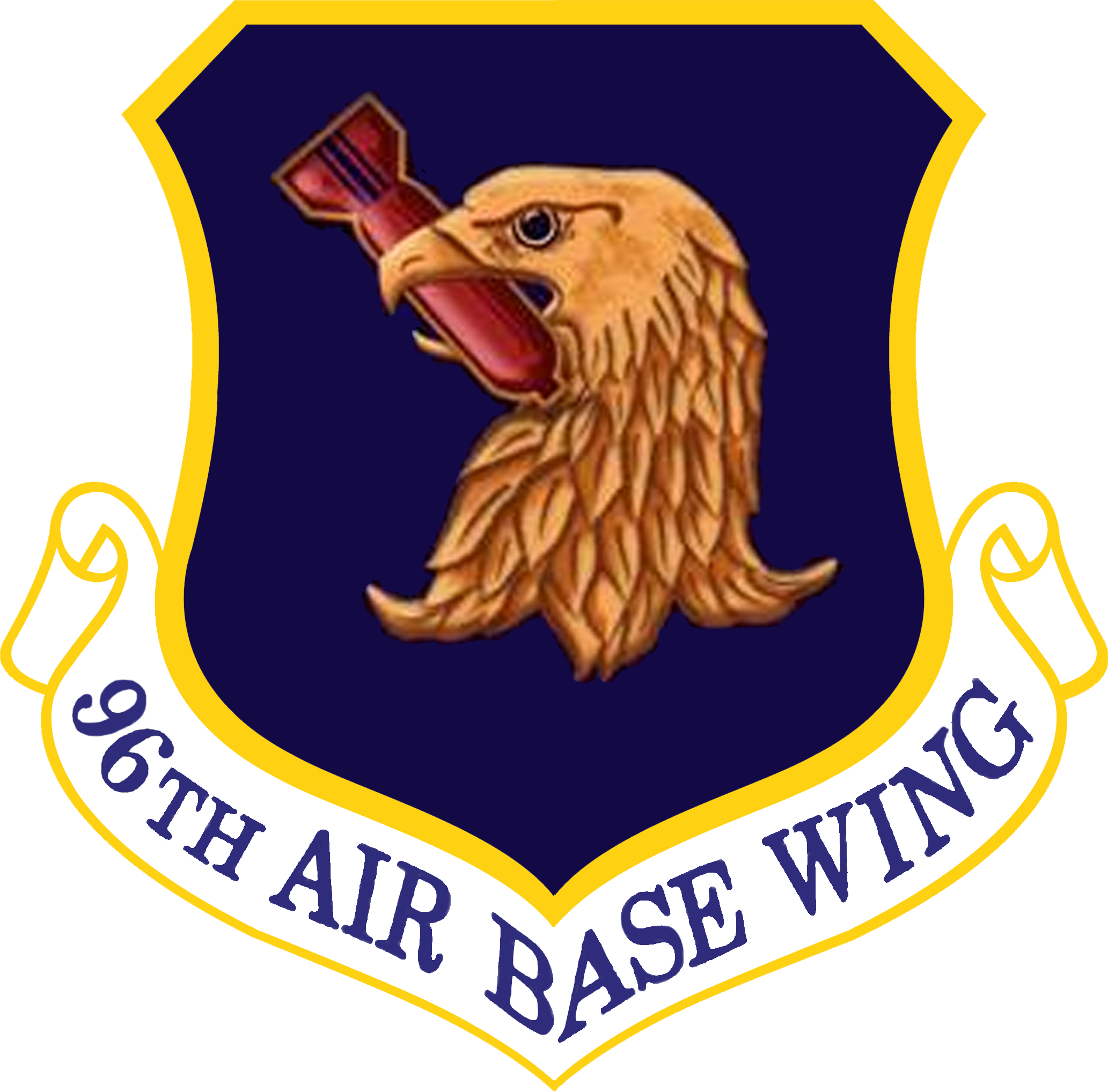
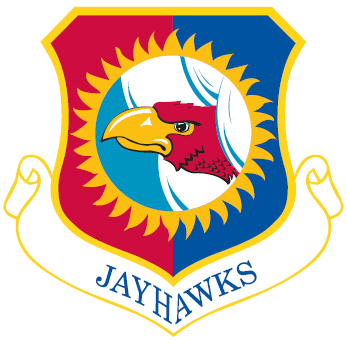
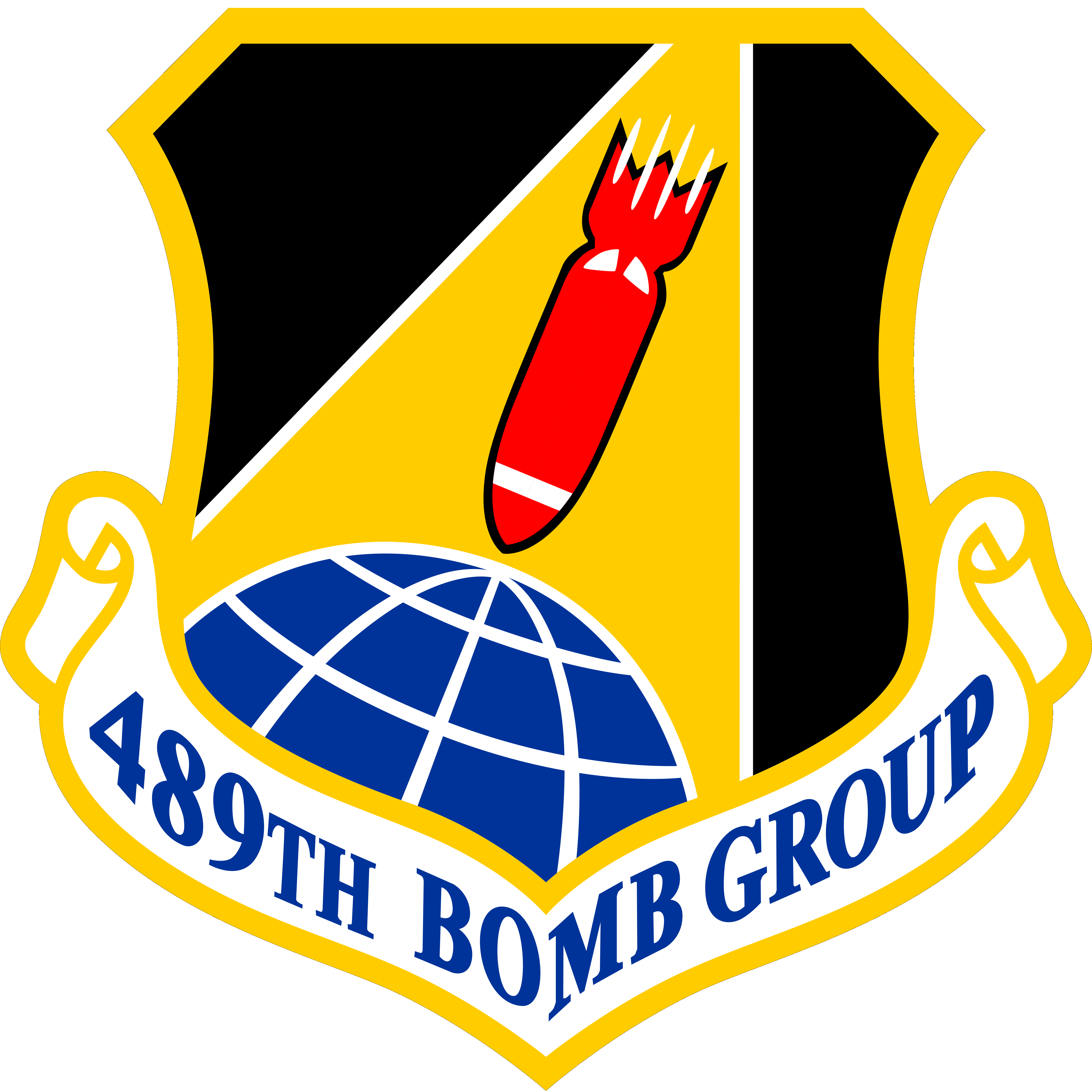
Active duty
Wing	Shield	Squadron	Location	Variants	Service dates	Notes
7th Bomb Wing		9 BS; 13 BS; 28 BS	Dyess AFB, TX	B-1B	1992–present 2000-2005; 1994–present
28th Bomb Wing		34 BS; 37 BS; 77 BS	Ellsworth AFB, SD	B-1B	2002–present 1986–present 1986-1995; 1986-2002
319th Bomb Wing		46 BS	Grand Forks AFB, ND	B-1B	1986-1994
366th Wing		34 BS	Ellsworth AFB, SD; Mountain Home AFB, ID	B-1B	1994-1997; 1997-2002	Redesignated 366th Fighter Wing
384th Bomb Wing		28 BS	McConnell Air Force Base, KS	B-1B	1987-1994
412th Test Wing		419 FTS	Edwards AFB, CA	B-1B	1992–present
96th Bombardment Wing		337 BS; 338th Combat Crew Training Squadron (CCTS); 4018 CCTS	Dyess AFB, TX	B-1B	1985-1992; 1985-1992; 1984-1985
6510th Test Wing		6519 FTS	Edwards AFB, CA	B-1B	1974-1989
		410th Flight Test Squadron			1989-1992	Redesignated 412th Test Wing
Air National Guard
Wing	Shield	Squadron	Location	Variants	Service dates	Notes
116th Bomb Wing		128 BS	Robins AFB, GA	B-1B	1996-2002	Redesignated 116th Air Control Wing
184th Bomb Wing		127 BS	McConnell AFB, KS	B-1B	1994-2002	Redesignated 184th Intelligence Wing
Air Force Reserve Command
Wing	Shield	Squadron	Location	Variants	Service dates	Notes
489th Bomb Group		345 BS	Dyess AFB, TX	B-1B	2015-present

== Bibliography ==
- Withington, Thomas (2006). B-1B Lancer Units in Combat. Combat Aircraft. Vol. 60. London: Osprey Publishing. ISBN 1-84176-992-4.
