= 412th =

412th may refer to:

- 412th Bombardment Squadron or 912th Air Refueling Squadron (912 ARS), full-time active duty Regular Air Force squadron in California
- 412th Engineer Command (United States) (TEC), US Army Reserve unit, conducts theater-level engineer operations for Eighth U.S. Army, Korea
- 412th Fighter Squadron or 197th Air Refueling Squadron, flies the KC-135R Stratotanker
- 412th Flight Test Squadron (412 FLTS), part of the 412th Test Wing based at Edwards Air Force Base, California
- 412th Test Wing, wing of the United States Air Force, assigned to the Air Force Test Center at Edwards Air Force Base, California

== See also ==
- 412 (number)
- 412, the year 412 (CDXII) of the Julian calendar
- 412 BC
