= List of United States Air Force test squadrons =

This is a list of United States Air Force test squadrons. It covers units considered to be part of the Air Force and serves as a break out of the comprehensive List of United States Air Force squadrons. Most units in this list are assigned to Air Force Materiel Command, however, a few reside in other Major Commands of the United States Air Force.

== Flight Test Squadrons ==
| Squadron | Shield | Location | Nickname | Note |
|---|---|---|---|---|
| 10th Flight Test Squadron | | Tinker AFB | Sabres | B-52, B-1, KC-135, KC-46 and E-3s |
| 39th Flight Test Squadron | | Eglin AFB | | redesignated 39th Flying Training Squadron |
| 40th Flight Test Squadron | | Eglin AFB | | |
| 99th Flight Test Squadron | | | "Panthers" | |
| 337th Flight Test Squadron | | | | Inactive? |
| 339th Flight Test Squadron | | Robins AFB | | |
| 370th Flight Test Squadron | | Edwards AFB | | |
| 410th Test and Evaluation Squadron | | Beale AFB | | |
| 411th Flight Test Squadron | | Edwards AFB | | F-22 Flight Test |
| 412th Flight Test Squadron | | Edwards AFB | Speckled Trout | |
| 413th Flight Test Squadron | | Hurlburt Field | | formerly Det. 1, 46 OG; C-130, MH-53, UH-1, HH-60 |
| 415th Flight Test Flight | | Randolph AFB | | |
| 416th Flight Test Squadron | | Edwards AFB | Skulls | F-16 Fighting Falcon Flight Test |
| 417th Flight Test Squadron | | Eglin AFB | | Airborne Laser Program |
| 418th Flight Test Squadron | | Edwards AFB | | Tanker/Airlift Flight Test |
| 419th Flight Test Squadron | | Edwards AFB | | Bomber Flight Test |
| 420th Flight Test Flight | | Phoenix-Mesa Gateway Airport | | T-38 Talon |
| 445th Flight Test Squadron | | Edwards AFB | | |
| 452d Flight Test Squadron | | Edwards AFB | | UAV flight test |
| 461st Flight Test Squadron | | Edwards AFB | Deadly Jesters | F-35 |
| 486th Flight Test Squadron | | Eglin AFB | | C-32B |
| 514th Flight Test Squadron | | Hill AFB | | |
| 576th Flight Test Squadron | | Vandenberg AFB | Top Hand | Intercontinental Ballistic Missile Force. |
| 586th Flight Test Squadron | | Holloman AFB | Road Runners | |
Test Squadrons
| Squadron | Shield | Location | Nickname | Note |
| 14th Test Squadron | | Schriever AFB | | Reserve unit, augments 17 TS |
| 17th Test Squadron | | Schriever AFB | | 595th Space Group, SIDC |
| 47th Cyber Test Squadron | | Edwards AFB | | |
| 346th Test Squadron | | Lackland AFB | | Network Operations |
| 716th Test Squadron | | Arnold AFB | | Wind tunnel testing |
| 717th Test Squadron | | Arnold AFB | | Turbine engine testing |
| 718th Test Squadron | | Arnold AFB | | Space & missile testing |
| 746th Test Squadron | | Holloman AFB | | Central Inertial & GPS Test Facility (CIGTF) |
| 771st Test Squadron | | Edwards AFB | | Electronic Warfare T&E |
| 772d Test Squadron | | Edwards AFB | | |
| 773d Test Squadron | | Edwards AFB | | |
| 780th Test Squadron | | Eglin AFB | | |
| 781st Test Squadron | | Holloman AFB | | National Radar Cross-section Facility |
| 846th Test Squadron | | Holloman AFB | | Holloman High Speed Test Track (HHSTT) |
| 2857th Test Squadron | | Olmsted AFB | | Continuity of Government helicopter squadron |
Test and Evaluation Squadrons
| Squadron | Shield | Location | Nickname | Note |
| 15th Test and Evaluation Squadron | | Eglin AFB | | |
| 18th Special Operations Test and Evaluation Squadron | | Hurlburt Field | | |
| 21st Test and Evaluation Squadron | | Randolph AFB | | |
| 28th Test and Evaluation Squadron | | Eglin AFB | Scorpions | |
| 29th Test and Evaluation Squadron | | Eglin AFB | | |
| 31st Test and Evaluation Squadron | | Edwards AFB | | RQ-4 |
| 49th Test and Evaluation Squadron | | Barksdale AFB | Wolfpack | B-52 |
| 59th Test and Evaluation Squadron | | Nellis AFB | Golden Pride | |
| 72d Test and Evaluation Squadron | | Whiteman AFB | | B-2 |
| 84th Test and Evaluation Squadron | | Eglin AFB | | F-15E, F-15EX, F-16C |
| 85th Test and Evaluation Squadron | | Eglin AFB | Skulls | F-15E, F-15EX, F-16C |
| 88th Test and Evaluation Squadron | | Nellis AFB | | HC-130 |
| 337th Test and Evaluation Squadron | | Dyess AFB | | B-1B |
| 410th Test and Evaluation Squadron | | Edwards AFB | Baja Scorpions | |
| 417th Test and Evaluation Squadron | | Edwards AFB | | |
| 418th Test and Evaluation Squadron | | Davis-Monthan AFB | | |
| 422d Test and Evaluation Squadron | | Nellis AFB | Green Bats | F-15E, F-16C, A-10, F-22A, F-35 |
| 431st Test and Evaluation Squadron | | McClellan AFB | | Inactivated 30 June 1992 |
| 460th Test and Evaluation Squadron | | Nellis AFB | | F-15C, F-15E, F-16C, A-10, F-22A, F-35 |
| 556th Test and Evaluation Squadron | | Creech AFB | | MQ-1, MQ-9 |
| 605th Test and Evaluation Squadron | | | | |
| 1275th Test and Evaluation Squadron | | Edwards AFB | | Inactivated 1 October 1995 |
| 4200th Test and Evaluation Squadron | | Edwards AFB | | Inactivated 1 July 1986 |
| AMC Test and Evaluation Squadron | | | | previously the 33d Flight Test Squadron |

== See also ==
- List of United States Air Force squadrons
