= 417th Flight Test Squadron =

417th Flight Test Squadron

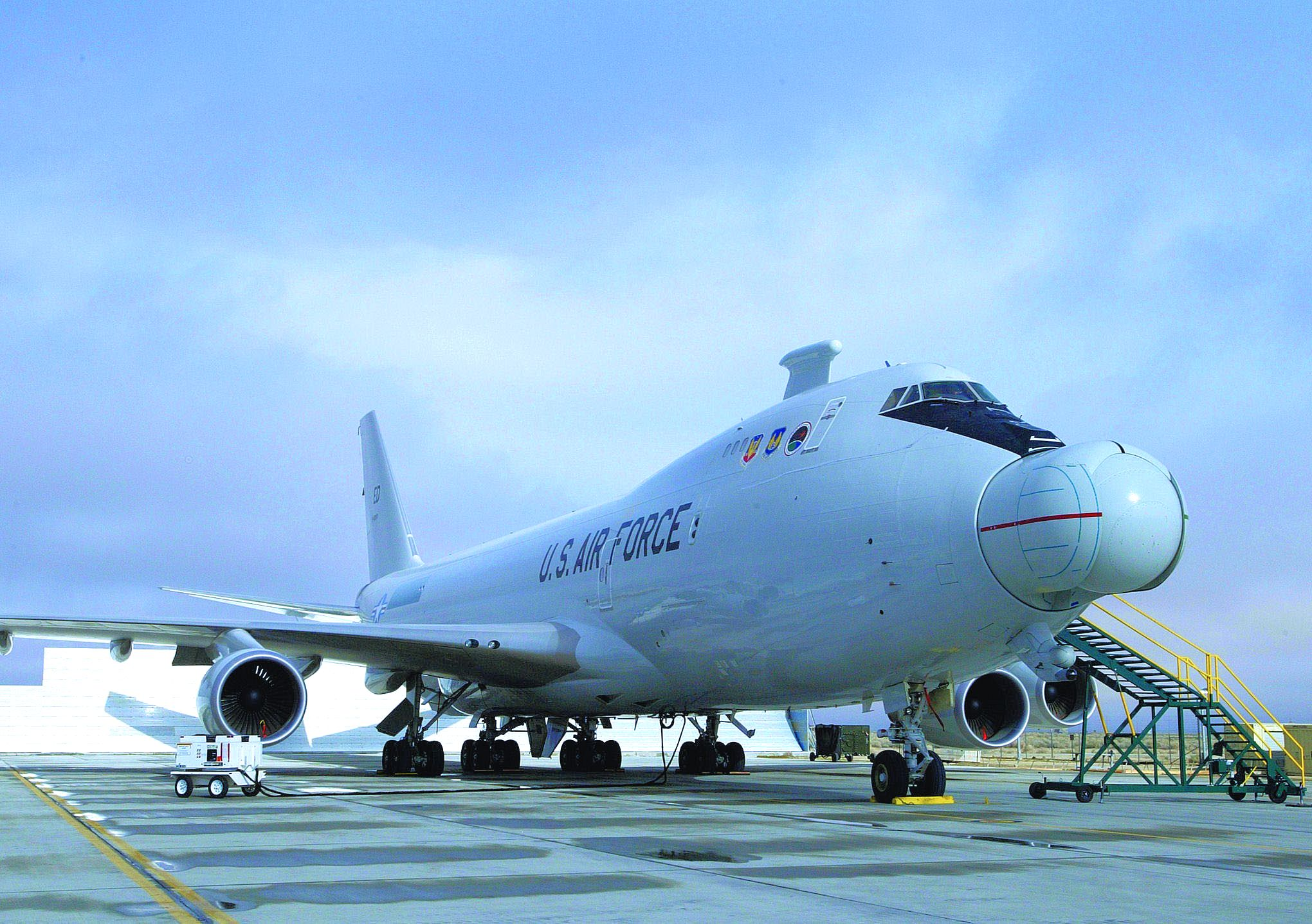
- 417th Flight Test Squadron Boeing YAL-1A
- Active: 1989–1995; 2006–2012; 2019–present
- Country: United States
- Branch: United States Air Force
- Type: Squadron
- Role: Flight Testing
- Part of: Air Force Materiel Command
- Garrison/HQ: Eglin Air Force Base
- Decorations: Air Force Outstanding Unit Award

Insignia
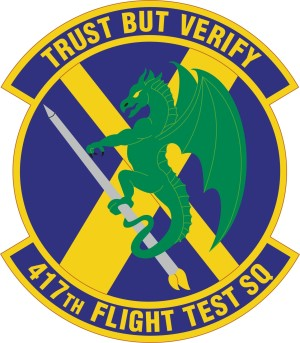
- 417th Flight Test Squadron emblem (Note: Approved 25 June 2007.)

The 417th Flight Test Squadron is an active United States Air Force squadron. It is assigned to the 96th Operations Group at Eglin Air Force Base, Florida, where it was reactivated on 17 April 2019.

The squadron was first activated in 1989 as the 6517th Test Squadron and conducted flight testing of the McDonnell Douglas C-17 Globemaster III until it was inactivated in 1995 as the 417th Test Squadron.

It was reactivated in 2006 and performed ground and flight testing on the Boeing YAL-1A until 2010, before that program was cancelled.

== History ==
=== C-17 Globemaster III testing ===
Established in 1989 as the 6517th Test Squadron to perform flight testing on the new McDonnell Douglas C-17 Globemaster III airlifter which was developed by McDonnell Douglas to replace the aging Lockheed C-141 Starlifter. The squadron received its first YC-17A (T-1) in late 1991 (87-25). Five more C-17A production models (88-265, 88-266 (P-1, P-2, LotI)), (89-1189 - 89-1192 (Lot II, P-3, P-4, P-5)) participated in extensive flight testing and evaluation. Testing was completed and the first production model was delivered to the 437th Airlift Wing, Charleston Air Force Base, South Carolina on 14 July 1993.

The first C-17 squadron was operational (17th Airlift Squadron) in January 1995. The squadron was inactivated on 1 October and C-17 support was transferred to the 418th Flight Test Squadron.

=== YAL-1A Airborne Laser testing ===
It was reactivated in March 2006 for flight testing on Boeing YAL-1A Airborne Laser aircraft (ABL). The ABL was an airborne-directed energy weapon system. The YAL-1A is a prototype that employs a highly modified Boeing 747-400 airframe equipped with sensors, lasers and sophisticated optics to find, track and destroy ballistic missiles in their boost, or ascent, phase.

In February 2007, the ABL began a series of flight tests, which included the first in-flight firing of the TILL targeting laser at a simulated target, in March 2007. This was followed by flight tests of the BILL illuminating laser and tests of TILL, BILL and a surrogate high-energy laser (SHEL) low-power laser. Installation of the six COIL laser modules was completed in February 2008. The first firing ('first light') of the COIL laser took place in September 2008. The test lasted less than a second and was followed by further ground tests of increased duration and power. In November 2008, the COIL laser was fired and focused through the beam control / fire control system.

A high energy laser aboard the aircraft was successfully fired from Edwards Air Force Base in August 2009. The YAL 1A laser travels at the speed of light to destroy ballistic missiles in their boost phase of flight. In January 2010, the high energy laser was fired to intercept a test Missile Alternative Range Target Instrument (MARTI).

In February 2010, the US MDA and Boeing jointly tested the speed, precision and breakthrough potential of directed energy weapons deployed in the ABL test bed. In 2010, the ALTB successfully knocked a "threat representative" missile out of flight from a distance of 50 miles. This resulted in the program receiving an additional $40 million in funding even though the Secretary of Defense himself admitted it was not realistic. However, in that same year the device failed two tests in a row. In 2011 funding was eliminated as the program was eight years behind schedule and it had a staggeringly large budget of $500 million per year.

The program was terminated due to budget reductions on 14 February 2012. The YAL-1A Airborne Laser Test Bed aircraft was ferried to Davis Monthan Air Force Base, Arizona where it was placed in storage at the Air Force's Aerospace Maintenance and Regeneration Group.

== Lineage ==
- Designated as the 6517th Test Squadron and activated on 10 March 1989

Redesignated 417th Test Squadron on 2 October 1992
Redesignated 417th Flight Test Squadron on 1 March 1994
Inactivated on 1 October 1995

- Activated on 16 March 2006

Inactivated on 30 June 2010

- Activated 24 April 2019

=== Assignments ===
- 6510th Test Wing (later 412th Test Wing), 10 March 1989
- 412th Operations Group, 1 October 1993 – 1 October 1995
- 412th Operations Group, 16 March 2006 – 30 June 2010
- 96th Operations Group, 24 April 2019 – present

=== Stations ===
- Edwards Air Force Base, California, 10 March 1989 – 1 October 1995
- Edwards Air Force Base, California, 16 March 2006 – 30 June 2010
- Eglin Air Force Base, Florida, 24 April 2019 – present

=== Aircraft ===
- McDonnell Douglas/Boeing C-17 Globemaster III, 1989-1995
- Boeing YAL-1 Airborne Laser, 2006-2012
- Lockheed Martin C-130 Hercules (All variants) 2019–present

== See also ==
- List of United States Air Force test squadrons
