= 419th Flight Test Squadron =

419th Flight Test Squadron

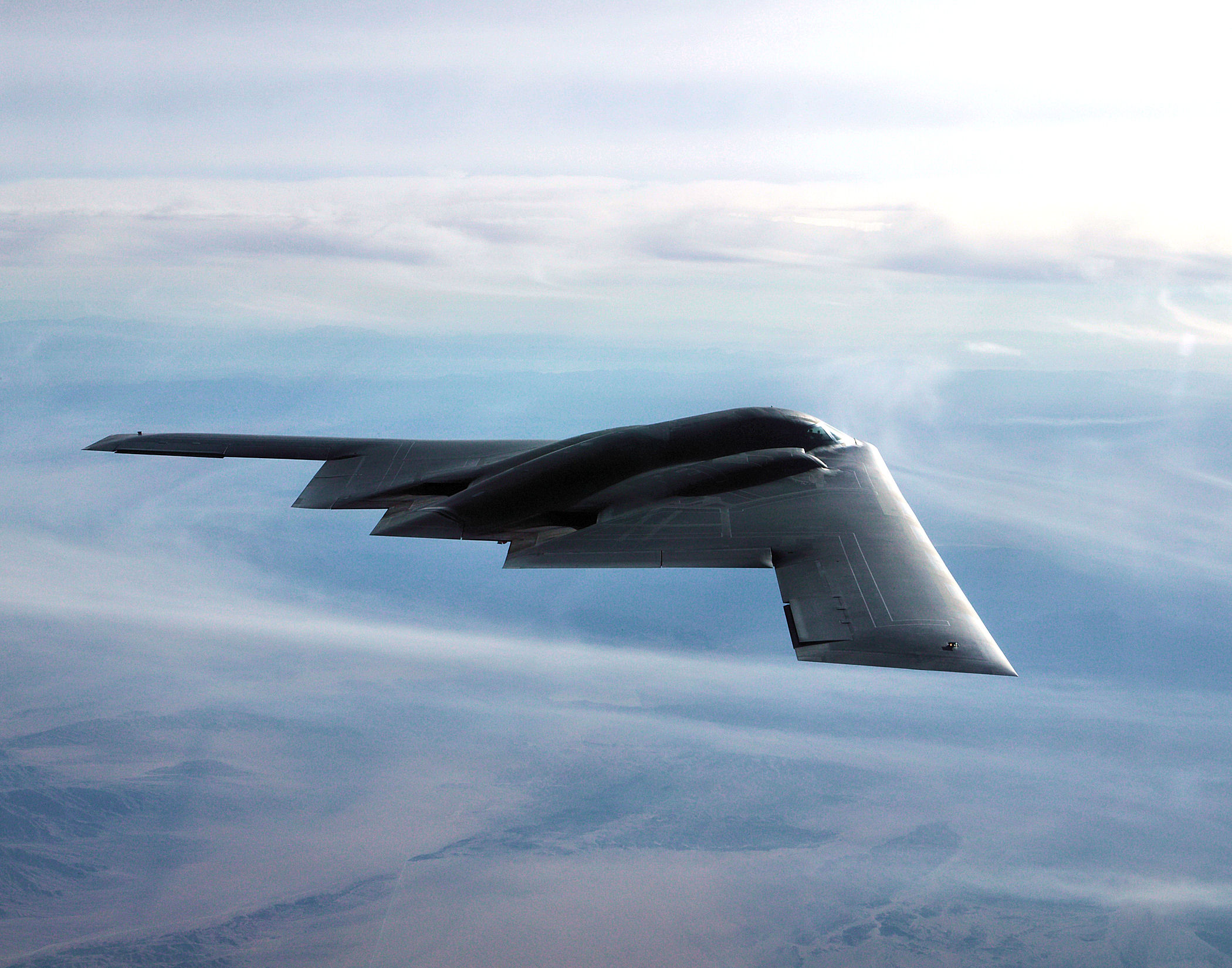
- Squadron B-2 Spirit
- Active: 1942–1945; 1958–1962; 1989–present
- Country: United States
- Branch: United States Air Force
- Type: Squadron
- Role: Flight Testing
- Part of: Air Force Materiel Command
- Garrison/HQ: Edwards Air Force Base, California
- Motto: Silent Sting
- Engagements: European Theater of Operations; Mediterranean Theater of Operations
- Decorations: Distinguished Unit Citation; Air Force Outstanding Unit Award

Insignia
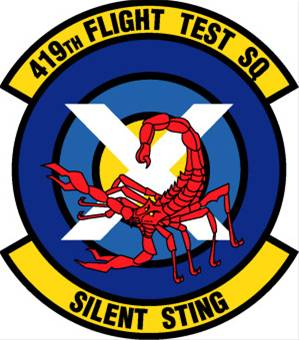
- 419th Flight Test Squadron emblem (Note: Approved 21 February 1990. Description: Azure, a rondel celeste fimbriated Sable, charged with a bezant of the like [color]. Overall, a saltire couped Argent superimposed in base by a scorpion Gules; all within a diminished bordure Black.)

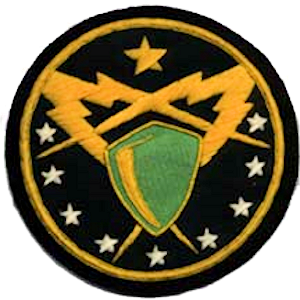
- Patch with 419th Bombardment Squadron emblem (Note: Approved 11 August 1961. Description: On an Air Force blue disc bordered Air Force golden yellow, four white lightning flashes fretted, two issuing radiant from dexter chief, and two issuing radiant from sinister chief; all surmounted by an Air Force golden yellow shield, details and shading golden brown; in chief a large Air Force golden yellow star; encircling the lower half of the emblem nine small white stars.)
- Tail code: ED (1992-present)

Aircraft flown
- Bomber: B-2 Spirit; B-1 Lancer; B-52 Stratofortress

The 419th Flight Test Squadron is a United States Air Force squadron. It is assigned to the 412th Operations Group, Air Force Materiel Command, stationed at Edwards Air Force Base, California.

During World War II, the 419th Bombardment Squadron was a Boeing B-17 Flying Fortress squadron, assigned to the 301st Bombardment Group of Fifteenth Air Force. It earned two Distinguished Unit Citations. In 1958, the squadron was activated as a Boeing B-47 Stratojet squadron as part of Strategic Air Command's nuclear force, but was discontinued four years later. In 1993, the squadron was consolidated with the 6519th Test Squadron, which had been conducting test operations at Edwards since 1989.

== Mission ==
The 419th is responsible for developmental testing of Northrop Grumman B-2 Spirit, Rockwell B-1 Lancer, and Boeing B-52 Stratofortress strategic bombers. It conducts tests to extend the usable life of these airframes, upgrade their combat capabilities, and integrate new weapons systems into their operation. It works closely with Air Combat Command operational testing elements for these systems, often flying with them on the same missions. It receives overall testing oversight from the program management offices of these systems.

== History ==
=== World War II ===
==== Initial organization and training ====
The first predecessor of the squadron was organized as the 29th Reconnaissance Squadron, one of the four Boeing B-17 Flying Fortress squadrons of the 301st Bombardment Group in February 1942. In April 1942, it was redesignated the 419th Bombardment Squadron, a heavy bomber unit. In late May, it moved to Alamogordo Army Air Field, New Mexico, although the air echelon operated from Muroc Army Air Base, flying antisubmarine patrols off the California coast until early June 1942. The ground echelon moved to Virginia to prepare for movement overseas, leaving for Fort Dix and the Port of Embarkation on 19 July. The air echelon left for Brainard Field, Connecticut in late June. The squadron ferried its Flying Fortresses via the North Atlantic ferry route as part of Operation Bolero, the build up of American forces in the United Kingdom. The squadron and its companion squadrons of the 301st Group were the first B-17F unit to arrive in England. (Note: The 97th Bombardment Group had arrived earlier, but was equipped with B-17Es. Freeman, p. 13.)

==== Operations from England ====
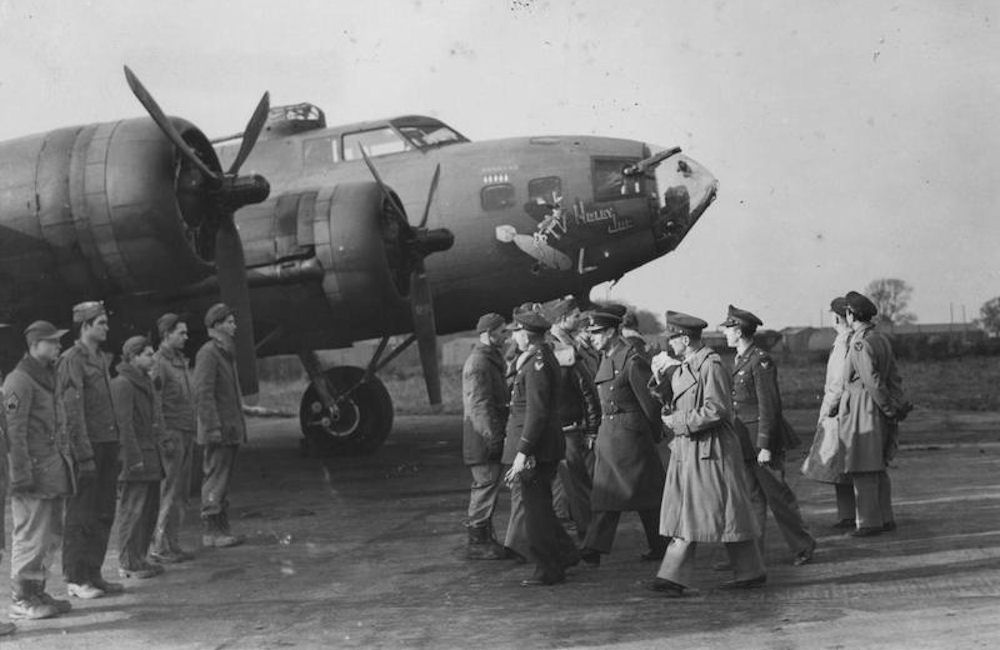
King George VI visiting the 301st Bombardment Group in 1942. (Note: The aircraft in the background is Boeing B-17F-1-BO Flying Fortress, serial 41-24352. This plane suffered severe battle damage on a mission to steel works at Lille, France (Although located in the Lille metropolitan area, the target was actually in Belgium, on the left bank of the Deûle River.) on 9 October 1942. The crew prepared to bail out but the bomber made it back to Chelveston with one engine on fire, two propellers feathered and a couple of hundred holes in it. Following this mission, it was named Holey Joe.)

The ground and air echelons were reunited at RAF Chelveston on 19 August 1942. The squadron flew its first mission on 5 September 1942. From England it attacked targets primarily in France, including submarine pens, airfields, railroad targets, and bridges. On 14 September, the 301st Group and its squadrons were reassigned to XII Bomber Command in preparation for Operation Torch, the invasion of North Africa, but they continued to operate under the control of VIII Bomber Command. Between 20 and 23 November 1942, the air echelon moved forward to bases in southeastern England, from which it flew directly to Tafaraoui Airfield, Algeria. The ground echelon sailed for Algeria from Liverpool on 8 December 1942.

==== Combat in the Mediterranean ====
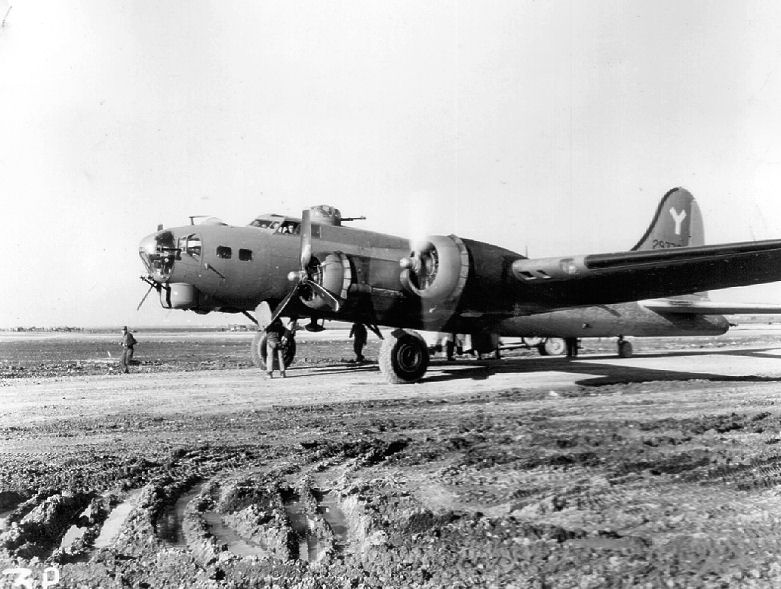
B-17G of the 301st Bombardment Group in Italy, 1944

Until August 1943, the squadron operated from airfields in Algeria, bombing docks, shipping facilities, airfields and marshalling yards in Tunisia, Sicily, and Sardinia. It also attacked enemy ships operating between Sicily and Tunisia. On 6 April 1943, the squadron withstood heavy flak from shore defenses and enemy vessels, when it attacked a merchant convoy near Bizerte, Tunisia carrying supplies essential for the Axis defense of Tunisia. For this mission it was awarded the Distinguished Unit Citation (DUC). In May and June, it participated in Operation Corkscrew, the bombing and invasion of Pantelleria, prior to the invasion of Sicily.

Starting in July 1943, the squadron began flying numerous missions to targets in Italy, moving forward to Oudna Airfield, Tunisia in early August. In November 1943, strategic and tactical forces in the Mediterranean were divided and the squadron became part of Fifteenth Air Force. It moved to Italy in December 1943 and in February 1944 it was established at Lucera Airfield, Italy, from which it would conduct combat operations for the remainder of the war. From its Italian base, it concentrated on the strategic bombing campaign against Germany, attacking oil centers, lines of communications, and industrial areas in Austria, Bulgaria, Czechoslovakia, France, Germany, Greece, Hungary, Italy, Poland, Romania, and Yugoslavia. On 23 February 1944, it participated in an attack on the Messerschmitt aircraft factory at Regensburg, succeeding despite "viscous" attacks by enemy interceptors. For this mission, it was awarded a second DUC.

The 419th also flew air support missions near Anzio and Monte Cassino, provided cover for Operation Dragoon, the invasion of southern France and the advance of the Red Army in the Balkans and the Allies of World War II advances in the Po Valley. It engaged in shuttle bombing missions to airfields in the Soviet Union during the summer of 1944.

==== Return to the United States ====
Following V-E Day, the squadron remained in Italy until July 1945. In August, it was designated as a "very heavy" unit in preparation for conversion to the Boeing B-29 Superfortress and deployment to Pacific Theater. Before the squadron arrived at its planned training base, Pyote Army Air Field, Texas, Japan had surrendered and there was no need for additional bomber units. The squadron was inactivated in October 1945, shortly before Pyote ended training operations and became an aircraft storage depot.

=== Strategic Air Command ===
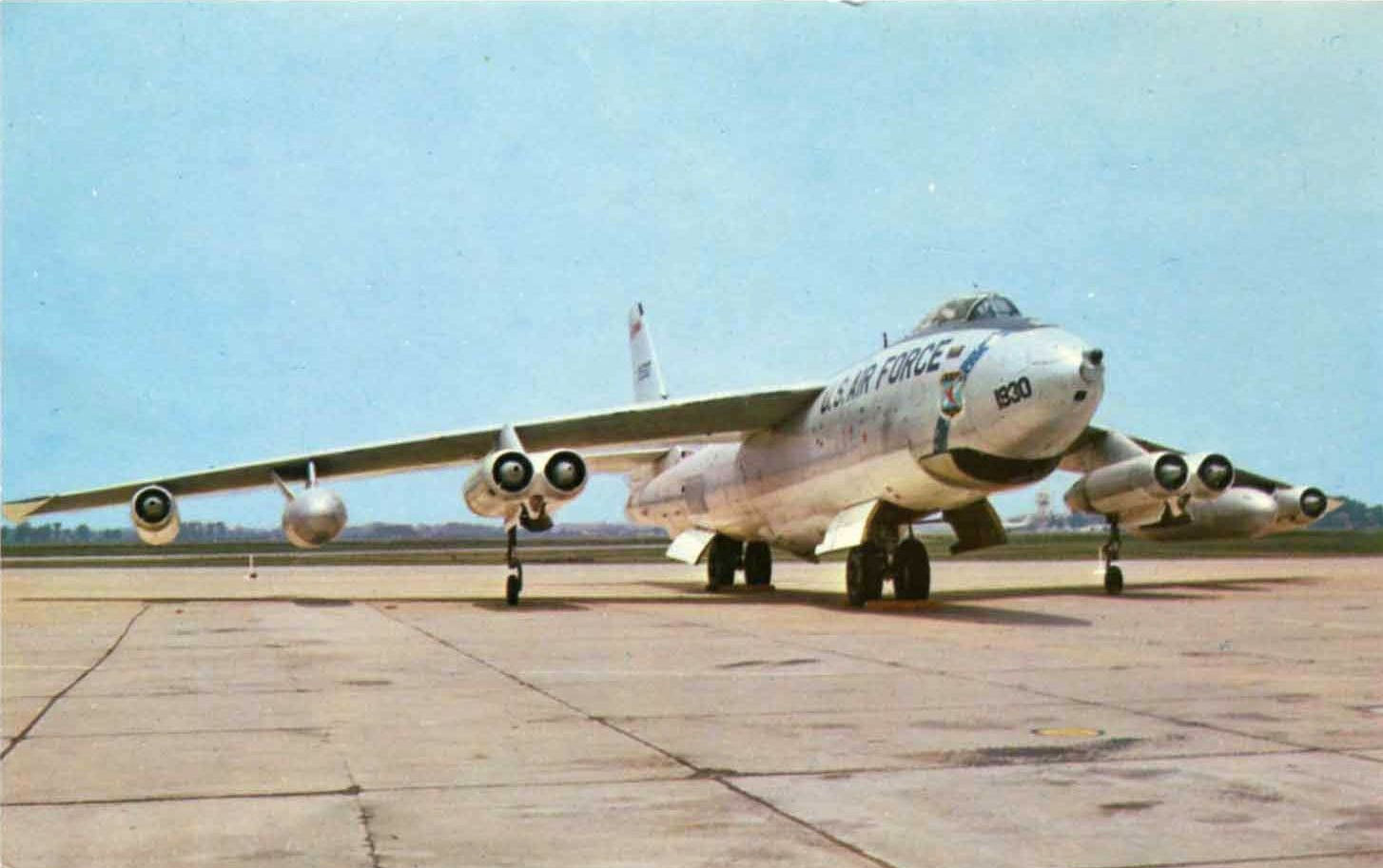
301st Bombardment Wing B-47 (Note: Aircraft is Lockheed Aircraft manufactured Boeing B-47E-55-LM Stratojet, serial 53-1830 parked at Langley Air Force Base in 1960. This plane was sent to the Military Aircraft Storage and Disposition Center on 18 January 1963 and scrapped on 30 October 1967. Baugher, Joe (5 August 2023). "1953 USAF Serial Numbers". Joe Baugher.)

From 1958, the Boeing B-47 Stratojet wings of Strategic Air Command (SAC) began to assume an alert posture at their home bases, reducing the amount of time spent on alert at overseas bases. The SAC alert cycle divided itself into four parts: planning, flying, alert and rest to meet General Thomas S. Power's initial goal of maintaining one third of SAC’s planes on fifteen minute ground alert, fully fueled and ready for combat to reduce vulnerability to a Soviet missile strike. To implement this new system B-47 wings reorganized from three to four squadrons. The 419th was activated at Lockbourne Air Force Base as the fourth squadron of the 301st Bombardment Wing. The alert commitment was increased to half the squadron's aircraft in 1962 and the four squadron pattern no longer met the alert cycle commitment, so the squadron was inactivated on 1 January 1962.

=== Flight test squadron ===
The second predecessor of the squadron was organized as the 6519th Test Squadron at Edwards Air Force Base in October 1989, taking over the Air Force Flight Test Center's Strategic Systems Division testing of the Boeing B-52G and B-52H Stratofortress. It gained the Rockwell B-1 Lancer program from the 6510th Test Squadron in 1991. On 1 October 1992, the 6519th and 419th squadrons were consolidated, with the consolidated unit redesignating as the 419th Test Squadron the following day.

The squadron is the Air Force element of the Global Power Bomber Combined Test Force. It also operated the Unmanned Aerial Vehicle (UAV) test program General Atomics MQ-1 Predator from 1994 until 2000, when the UAV program was realigned.

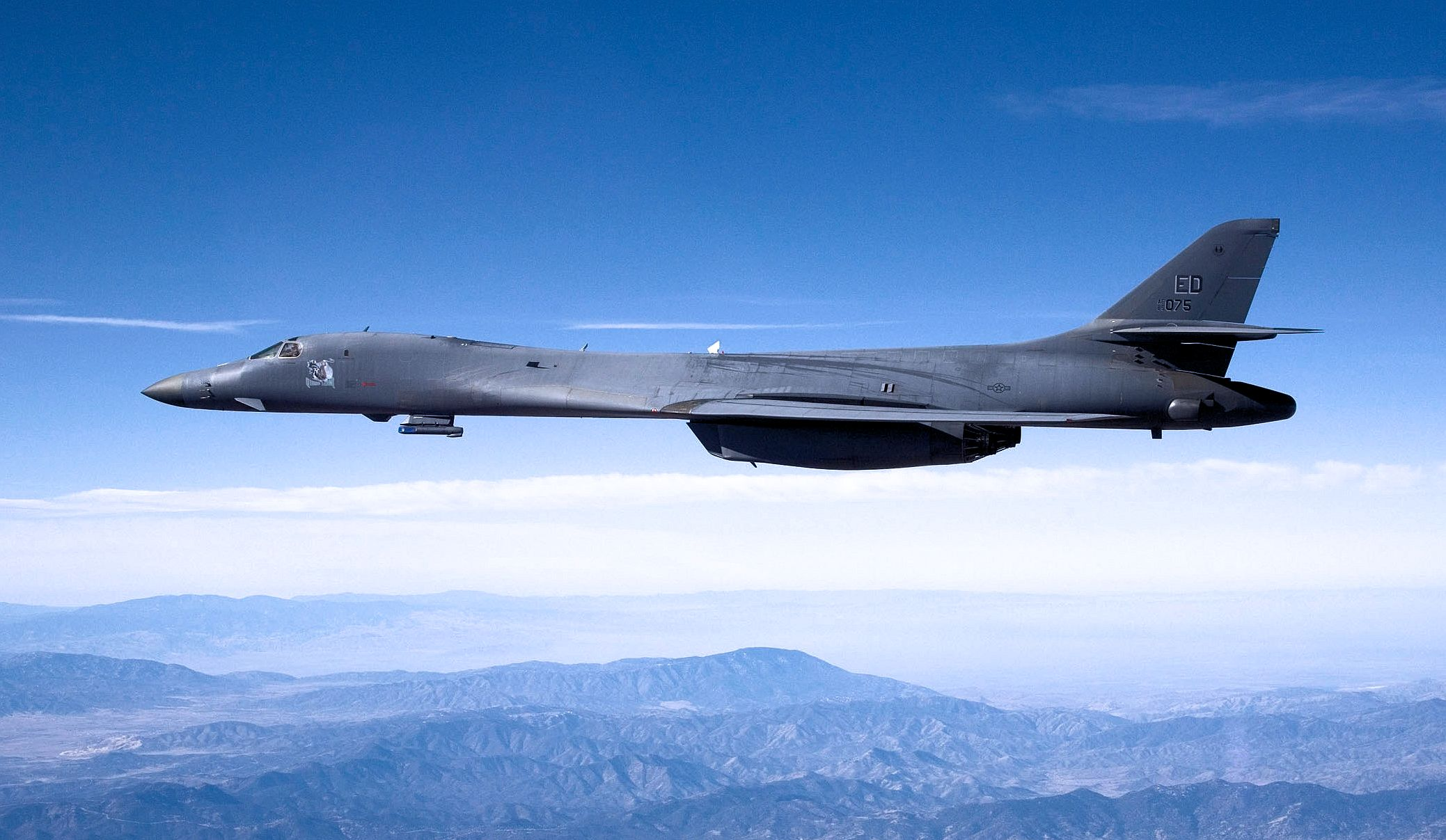
Squadron B-1B Lancer (Note: Aircraft is Rockwell B-1B Lancer Lot IV, serial 85-0075, converted to Block D in 1998. Earlier named Banshee and Dakota Demolition.Baugher, Joe (10 June 2023). "1985 USAF Serial Numbers". Joe Baugher.)

The squadron added the Northrop Grumman B-2 Spirit program from the inactivating 420th Flight Test Squadron on 30 December 1997. It has also tested external weapons loads on the B-1 Lancer, in tests to increase its weapons loads both internally and by adding an external weapons carriage capability. It has also tested the Litening targeting pod on the B-52.

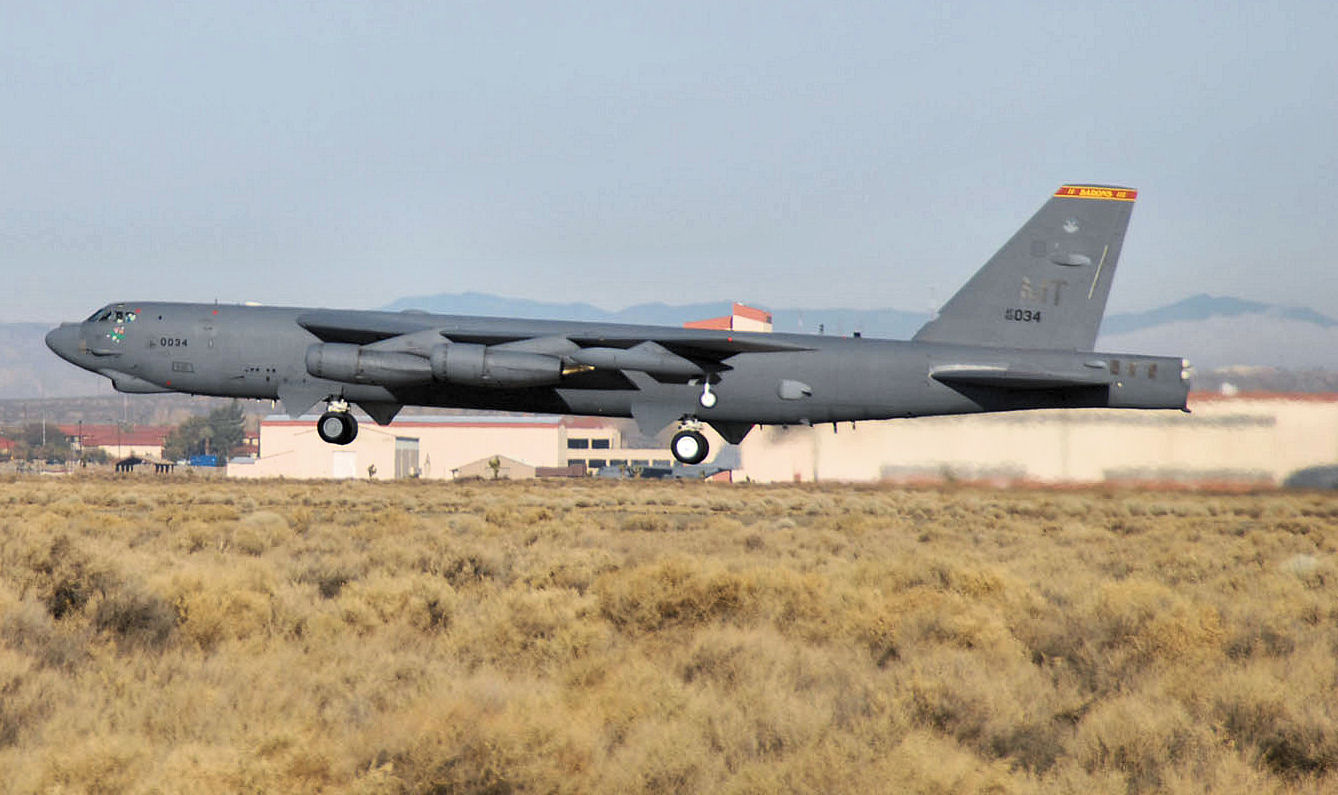
Squadron B-52H Stratofortress taking off on an AGM-183 test flight (Note: Aircraft is Boeing B-52H-150-BW Stratofortress, serial 60-0034, Wise Guy. Sent to the Aerospace Maintenance and Regeneration Center by March 2009, but returned to service in March 2019 with the 2nd Bomb Wing. Baugher, Joe (3 October 2023). "1960 USAF Serial Numbers". Joe Baugher.)

The squadron has also performed tests with hypersonic vehicles, launching them from its B-52s. In May 2010, a squadron launched a Boeing X-51 Waverider experimental unmanned scramjet. On 14 May 2022, a squadron B-52 launched a AGM-183A Air-launched Rapid Response Weapon, another hypersonic weapon. However, this program was cancelled in 2023, due to repeated system failures.

In the spring of 2015, the 445th Flight Test Squadron, which had been conducting "Test Operations" at Edwards was inactivated and its mission transferred to other test squadrons. In this reorganization, the squadron gained the Beechcraft C-12 Huron Formal Training Unit.

== Lineage ==
419th Bombardment Squadron

- Constituted as the 29th Reconnaissance Squadron (Heavy) on 28 January 1942

Activated on 3 February 1942
Redesignated 419th Bombardment Squadron (Heavy) on 22 April 1942
Redesignated 419th Bombardment Squadron, Heavy c. 6 March 1944
Redesignated 419th Bombardment Squadron, Very Heavy on 5 August 1945
Inactivated on 15 October 1945
Redesignated 419th Bombardment Squadron, Medium on 20 August 1958
Activated on 1 December 1958
Discontinued and inactivated on 1 January 1962
Consolidated with the 6519th Test Squadron as the 6519th Test Squadron on 1 October 1992

419th Flight Test Squadron

- Designated as the 6519th Test Squadron and activated on 10 March 1989

Consolidated with the 419th Bombardment Squadron on 1 October 1992
Redesignated 419th Test Squadron on 2 October 1992
Redesignated 419th Flight Test Squadron on 1 March 1994

=== Assignments ===
- 301st Bombardment Group, 3 Feb 1942 – 15 Oct 1945
- 301st Bombardment Wing, 1 Dec 1958 – 1 Jan 1962
- 6510th Test Wing (later 412th Test Wing), 10 March 1989
- 412th Operations Group, 1 Oct 1993 – present

=== Stations ===
- Geiger Field, Washington, 3 February 1942
- Alamogordo Army Air Field, New Mexico, 28 May 1942 (operated from Muroc Army Air Base, California, c. 28 May - 14 June 1942)
- Richard E. Byrd Field, Virginia, 21 June - 19 July 1942
- RAF Chelveston (AAF-105), England, 19 August 1942
- Tafaraoui Airfield, Algeria, 24 November 1942
- Biskra Airfield, Algeria, 21 December 1942
- Ain M'lila Airfield, Algeria, 16 January 1943
- Saint-Donat Airfield, Algeria, 8 March 1943
- Oudna Airfield, Tunisia, 6 August 1943
- Cerignola Airfield, Italy, 10 December 1943
- Lucera Airfield, Italy, 2 February 1944 – July 1945
- Sioux Falls Army Air Field, South Dakota, 28 July 1945
- Mountain Home Army Air Field, Idaho, 17 August 1945
- Pyote Army Air Field, Texas, 23 August – 15 October 1945
- Lockbourne Air Force Base, Ohio, 1 December 1958 – 1 January 1962
- Edwards Air Force Base, California, 10 March 1989 – present

=== Aircraft ===
- Boeing B-17 Flying Fortress, 1942–1945
- Boeing B-47 Stratojet, 1959–1961
- Boeing B-52 Stratofortress, 1989–present
- Rockwell B-1 Lancer, 1991–present
- General Atomics MQ-1 Predator, 1994–2000
- Northrop Grumman B-2 Spirit, 1997–present
- Beechcraft C-12 Huron, 2015 – unknown

=== Awards and campaigns ===
Award streamer	Award	Dates	Notes
	Distinguished Unit Citation	6 April 1943	Tunisia, 419th Bombardment Squadron
	Distinguished Unit Citation	25 February 1944	Germany, 419th Bombardment Squadron
	Air Force Outstanding Unit Award	1 January 1961–1 January 1962	419th Bombardment Squadron
	Air Force Outstanding Unit Award	1 January 2010–31 December 2011	419th Flight Test Squadron
	Air Force Outstanding Unit Award	1 January–31 December 2012	419th Flight Test Squadron
	Air Force Outstanding Unit Award	1 January–31 December 2013	419th Flight Test Squadron

Campaign Streamer	Campaign	Dates	Notes
	Antisubmarine	28 May–24 June 1942	419th Bombardment Squadron
	Air Offensive, Europe	19 August 1942–24 November 1942	419th Bombardment Squadron
	Air Combat, EAME Theater	19 August 1942–11 May 1945	419th Bombardment Squadron
	Egypt-Libya	24 November 1942 1942–12 February 1943	419th Bombardment Squadron
	Tunisia	24 November 1942–13 May 1943	419th Bombardment Squadron
	Sicily	14 May 1943–17 August 1943	419th Bombardment Squadron
	Naples-Foggia	18 August 1943–21 January 1944	419th Bombardment Squadron
	Anzio	22 January 1944–24 May 1944	419th Bombardment Squadron
	Rome-Arno	22 January 1944–9 September 1944	419th Bombardment Squadron
	Central Europe	22 March 1944–21 May 1945	419th Bombardment Squadron
	Normandy	6 June 1944–24 July 1944	419th Bombardment Squadron
	Northern France	25 July 1944–14 September 1944	419th Bombardment Squadron
	Southern France	15 August 1944–14 September 1944	419th Bombardment Squadron
	North Apennines	10 September 1944–4 April 1945	419th Bombardment Squadron
	Rhineland	15 September 1944–21 March 1945	419th Bombardment Squadron
	Po Valley	3 April 1945–8 May 1945	419th Bombardment Squadron

== See also ==
- List of United States Air Force test squadrons
- Boeing B-17 Flying Fortress Units of the Mediterranean Theater of Operations
- List of B-47 units of the United States Air Force
- List of B-52 Units of the United States Air Force
- List of B-1 units of the United States Air Force
