= 410th Test and Evaluation Squadron =

410th Test and Evaluation Squadron

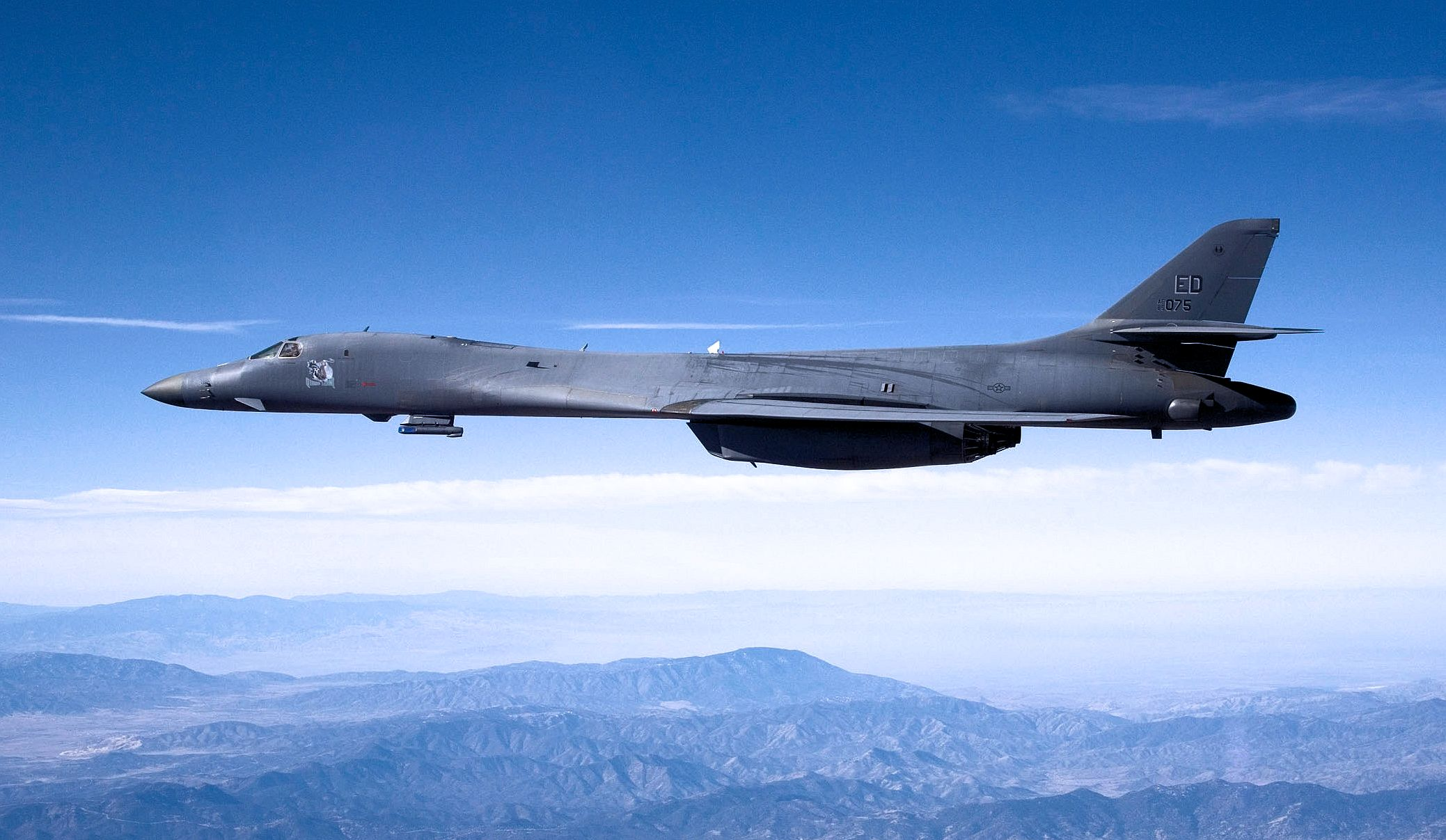
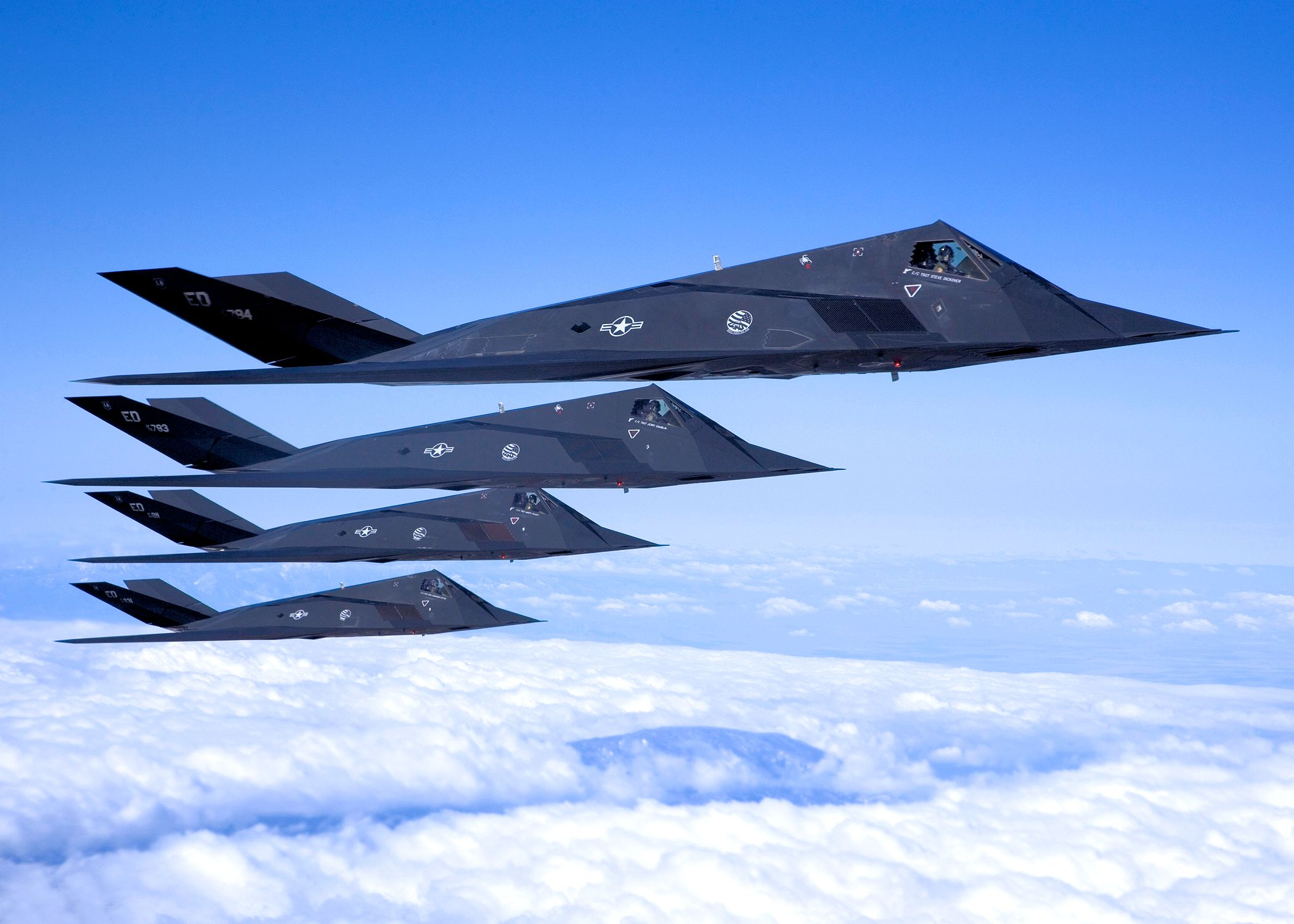
- Edwards Rockwell B-1B Lancer 85-0075 410th Flight Test Squadron – final F-117 four-ship formation flight over the Antelope Valley, 28 March 2007
- Active: 1989–2008; 2021–present
- Country: United States
- Branch: United States Air Force
- Role: Test and evaluation
- Part of: Air Combat Command
- Nickname(s): Baja Scorpions (1993–2008) (Note: Reportedly, after finding a large scorpion in their offices, the testing team adopted it as their mascot and dubbed themselves the "Baja Scorpions". The scorpion became the symbol of all F-117A testing.)
- Decorations: Air Force Outstanding Unit Award

Insignia
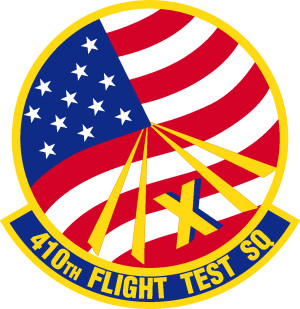
- 410th Test and Evaluation Squadron emblem (Note: Approved 9 August 1990. The emblem has been modified to include its current designation. Blazon: Bendy sinister wavy argent and gules the cypher X bendwise in base or garnished azure between four piles diminished in point bendwise of the like, a canton bendwise sinister of the fourth semé of eleven mullets white, all within a diminished bordure yellow.)

The 410th Test and Evaluation Squadron is an active United States Air Force squadron, stationed at Beale Air Force Base, California and assigned to the 753rd Test and Evaluation Group. The squadron was activated in 1989 as the 6510th Test Squadron, becoming the 410th Test Squadron in 1992 and the 410th Flight Test Squadron in 1994. The squadron's initial mission was flight and acceptance testing of the Rockwell B-1B Lancer bomber. In 1991, B-1 testing transferred to the 6519th Flight Test Squadron and the squadron became a paper unit. In 1993, it was reorganized as the Lockheed F-117A Nighthawk stealth fighter test squadron, which continued until it inactivated in 2008.

The squadron was redesignated and activated at Beale in October 2021.

== History ==
=== B-1B Lancer testing ===
==== Background ====
In November 1979, the Air Force began a study for a modified version of an existing airframe to carry air launched cruise missiles, called the Long-Range Combat Aircraft (LRCA). On 2 October 1981, President Ronald Reagan announced a Strategic Modernization Program, which would include the procurement of 100 (LRCA). The Rockwell International proposal for the LRCA was a modified B-1A, which was designated the B-1B Lancer.

The first B-1B incorporated several sub-assemblies of the No. 5 B-1A, which has been under construction when the B-1A program was cancelled. Rockwell test pilots flew it for the first time on 31 October 1984, from the Rockwell International assembly plant at Air Force Plant 42, Palmdale, California, landing at Edwards Air Force Base, California. The B-1B was ready for delivery to Strategic Air Command barely eight months after its first flight.

==== 6510th Test Squadron ====
When the aircraft reached operational squadrons, many shortcomings were discovered. Air Force Systems Command formed the 6510th Test Squadron in March 1989 to test these modifications. Modifications included those needed to improve the low-altitude range of the aircraft, which it was well short of its proposed maximum unrefueled range of 7,455 miles. The modifications increased the range of the aircraft from 1,300 nautical miles to over 3,000. Other modifications tested were to correct problems with the terrain-following radar system, defensive avionics systems, fuel leaks and the Lancer's central integrated test system. In December 1990 General Electric F101 engine turbofan blade failures caused the grounding of the B-1B aircraft, requiring additional modifications.

The B-1 test mission transferred to 6519th Test Squadron on 1 July 1991 and the squadron ceased operations, however it remained active.

=== F-117A Nighthawk testing ===
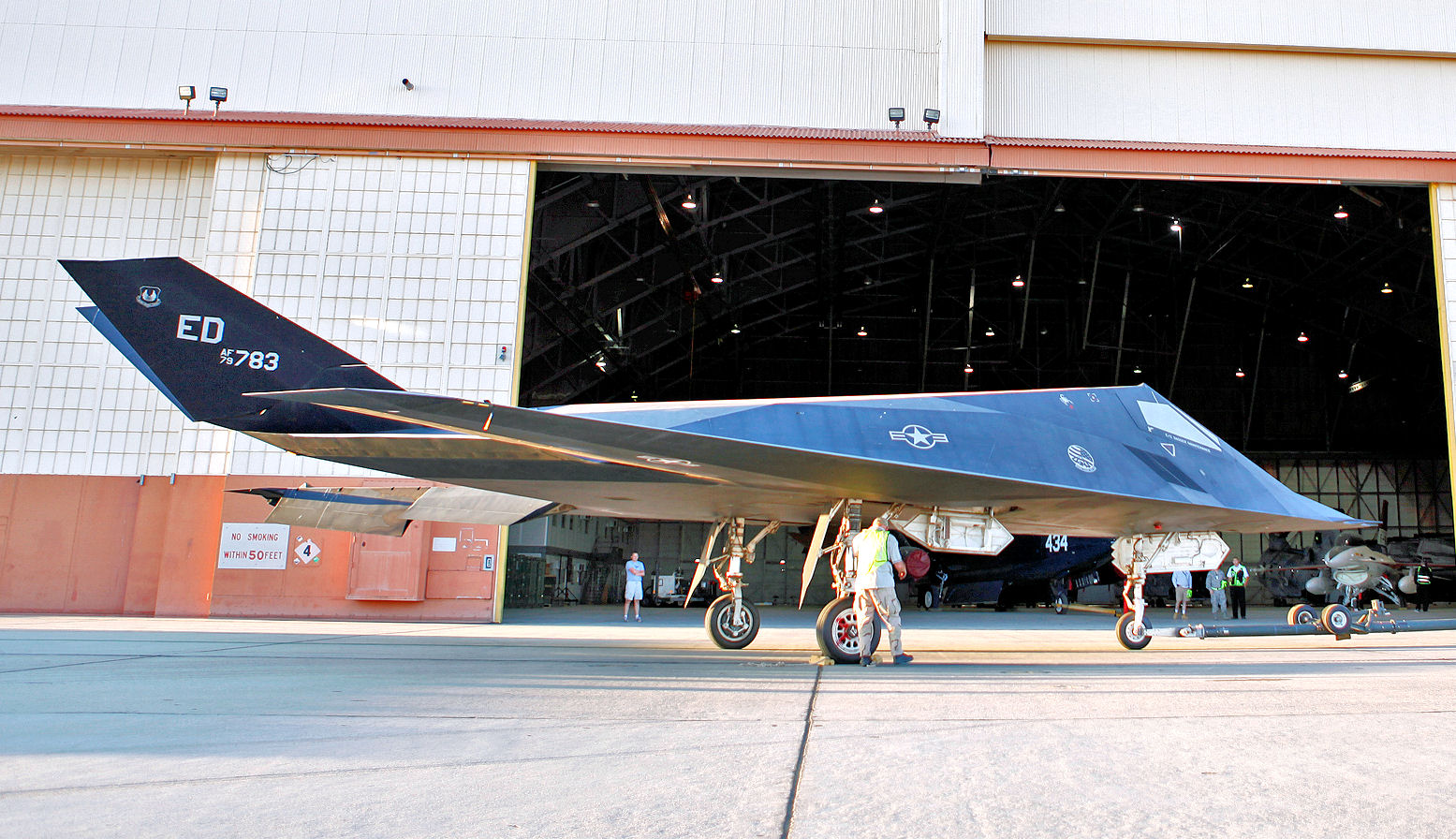
410th Flight Test Squadron F-117A Nighthawk (Note: Aircraft is Lockheed F-117A Nighthawk, serial 79-10783. This plane will be stored in Hangar 1210 at Edwards Air Force Base while it is refurbished for display at the Air Force Flight Test Center Museum.)

==== Background ====
In November 1978, the preliminary testing of the Have Blue stealth aircraft was successfully completed, and during November 1978, Lockheed Corporation was awarded a contract to begin full-scale development of the project. The program was given the code name Senior Trend. In 1980, the Senior Trend Joint (later Combined) Test Force was established at Area 51 consisting of a combination of Lockheed and USAF personnel as an acceptance test unit for newly manufactured aircraft. Air Force Systems Command personnel participating in the test were assigned to Air Force Flight Test Center, Detachment 3.

In June 1981, the first Senior Trend test aircraft was delivered for testing and on 18 June 1981 the first successful flight was made by a Lockheed test pilot. There were usually four to six test flights (about half contractor and half USAF) for acceptance. They included systems checks, handling qualities evaluations, and low observable radar verifications. All flights of the aircraft were made at night without lights and the runway was only briefly illuminated to facilitate landings and takeoffs.

The first production aircraft, 80-10785 was ready for its first flight on 20 April 1982. However, unknown to anyone, the fly-by-wire system had been hooked up incorrectly (pitch was yaw and vice versa). Upon liftoff, the plane immediately went out of control. Instead of the nose pitching up, it went horizontal. The aircraft went inverted and ended up traveling backwards through the air. The pilot had no time to eject, and the aircraft flew into the ground. The aircraft was damaged beyond repair, but some of its parts could be salvaged. On 10 November 1988, the long-rumored existence of the F-117 Stealth Fighter was finally officially confirmed by the Pentagon. In 1990 the last F-117A was delivered. and the flight test squadron no longer had to perform acceptance flights at Groom Lake. However, the flight test duties still included flights for refurbished aircraft received from Lockheed.

In February and March 1992 the F-117 test unit moved from Groom Lake to Air Force Plant 42 in Palmdale, California, where Lockheed had produced the aircraft, although some testing, especially RCS verification and other classified activity, was still conducted at Groom Lake. At Palmdale, the test unit came under the operational control of the 2874th Test Squadron (later the 337th Test Squadron) of the 412th Test Wing at Edwards as Detachment 5 of the squadron.

==== 410th Test Squadron ====
In February 1993, the wing's Director of Operations proposed that the unit be established as the 410th Test Squadron. Headquarters AFMC agreed to this, Detachment 5 was discontinued and its personnel and equipment assigned to the 410th Test Squadron (the new name of the 6510th) on 1 March 1993 and the squadron resumed operations.

Flight testing continued at Palmdale throughout the operational life of the F-117. On 1 August 2008, with the retirement of the F-117 from the inventory, the last aircraft of the 410th was flown to Tonopah TRA for permanent storage and the unit was inactivated.

=== Reactivation ===
The squadron was redesignated the 410th Test and Evaluation Squadron and activated at Beale Air Force Base, California on 1 October 2021.

== Lineage ==
- Designated as the 6510th Test Squadron and activated on 10 March 1989

Redesignated 410th Test Squadron on 2 October 1992
Redesignated: 410th Flight Test Squadron on 1 March 1994
Inactivated on 1 October 2008

- Redesignated 410th Test and Evaluation Squadron on 27 September 2021

Activated on 1 October 2021

=== Assignments ===
- 6510th Test Wing (later 412th Test Wing), 10 March 1989
- 412th Operations Group, 1 October 1993 – 1 October 2008
- 753d Test and Evaluation Group, 1 October 2021 – present

=== Stations ===
- Edwards Air Force Base, California, 10 March 1989
- Air Force Plant 42, Palmdale Regional Airport, California, 1 March 1993 – 1 October 2008
- Beale Air Force Base, California, 1 October 2021 – present

=== Aircraft ===
- Rockwell B-1B Lancer, 1989–1992
- Lockheed F-117 Nighthawk, 1993–2008

=== Awards and campaigns ===
Award streamer	Award	Dates	Notes
	Air Force Outstanding Unit Award	1 January 1996 – 31 December 1996	410th Flight Test Squadron
	Air Force Outstanding Unit Award	1 January 1997 – 31 December 1998	410th Flight Test Squadron

== See also ==
- List of United States Air Force test squadrons
