= 412th Flight Test Squadron =

412th Flight Test Squadron

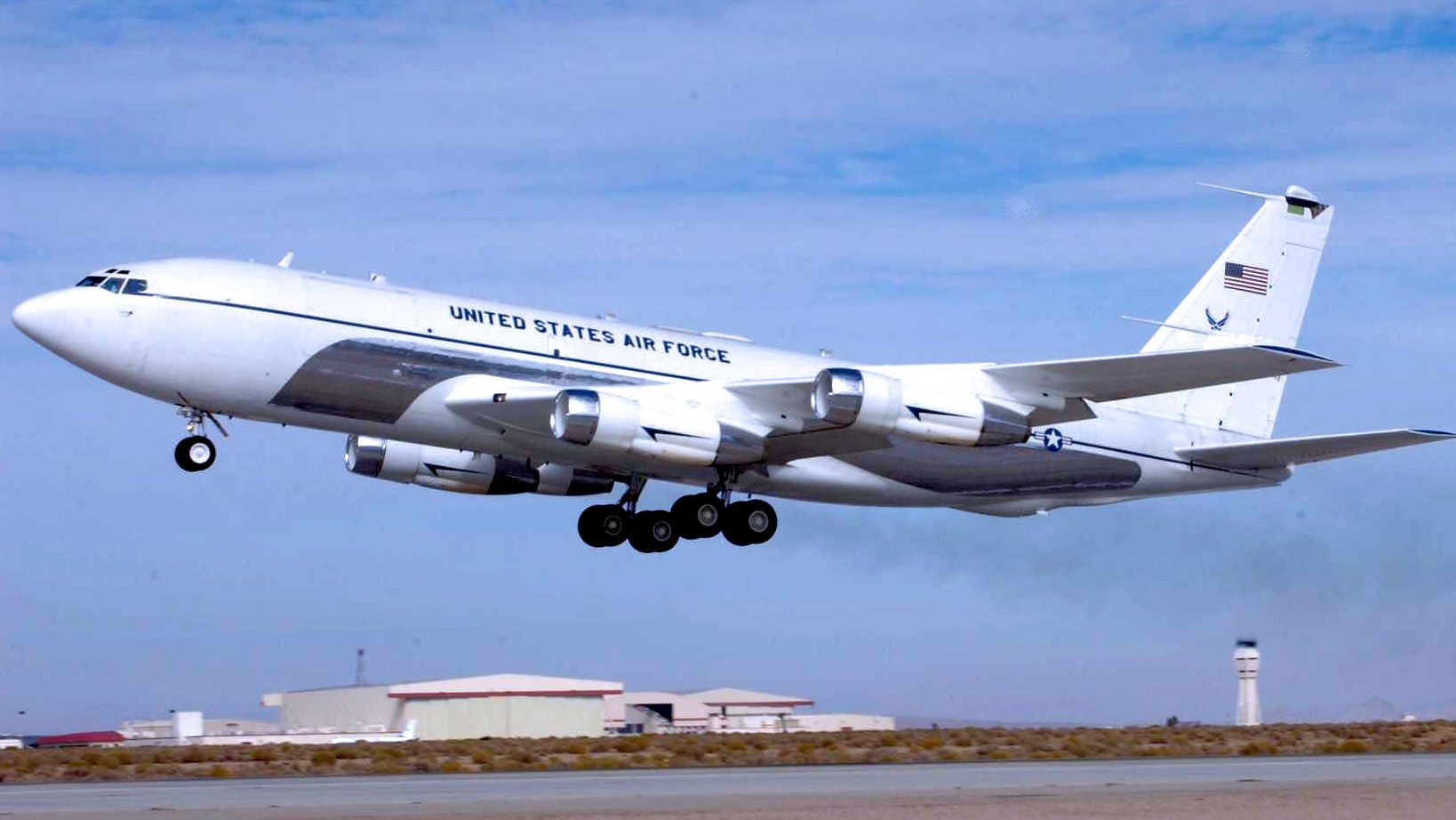
- 412th Flight Test Squadron – C-135C Speckled Trout 61-2669
- Active: 1994–2015
- Country: United States
- Branch: United States Air Force
- Type: Squadron
- Role: Flight Testing
- Part of: Air Force Materiel Command
- Motto: Speckled Trout
- Decorations: Air Force Outstanding Unit Award

Insignia
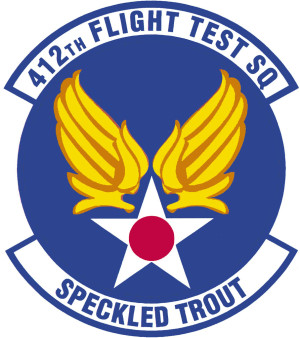
- 412th Flight Test Squadron emblem (approved 23 October 1995)
- Tail Code: ED

The 412th Flight Test Squadron was a United States Air Force squadron. It was assigned to the 412th Operations Group, Air Force Materiel Command, stationed at Edwards Air Force Base, California.

== Overview ==
Speckled Trout is the official name of a combined SAF/CSAF support mission and concurrent test mission. It was also the official nickname given to a modified C-135C, serial number 61-2669, that was used by the Secretary and the Chief of Staff of the Air Force for executive transport requirements. Fully equipped with an array of communications equipment, data links and cryptographic sets, the aircraft served a secondary role as a testbed for proposed command and control systems and was also used to evaluate future transport aircraft design. The 412th Flight Test Squadron (412 FLTS) of the Air Force Materiel Command (AFMC) at Edwards AFB, California operated the C-135 Speckled Trout airframe and managed its test mission.

The name Speckled Trout applies to both the organization and the aircraft. The name was chosen in honor of an early program monitor, Faye Trout, who assisted in numerous phases of the project. The word "speckled" was added because Trout apparently had "a lot of freckles."

Speckled Trout acquired the C-135C, serial number 61-2669, in 1974 and retired the aircraft on 13 January 2006. An interim aircraft was in use for the Speckled Trout mission until the 2008 delivery of the current aircraft, a modified KC-135R Stratotanker serial number 63-7980 with a more modern communications architecture testbed. The current KC-135R Speckled Trout also supports additional tests and air refueling requirements that the C-135C could not.

== Lineage ==
- Constituted as the 412th Flight Test Squadron on 22 December 1993

Activated on 1 January 1994
Inactivated on 15 May 2015

=== Assignments ===
- 412th Operations Group, 1 January 1994 – 15 May 2015

=== Stations ===
- Edwards Air Force Base, California, 1 January 1994 – 15 May 2015

=== Aircraft ===
- C-135 61-2669 1974–2006
- KC-135E 57-2589 "Casey 01" 2004–2007
- KC-135R 63-7980 2007–2015
- C-20E/K 70139 "Speckled Minnow" 2008–2009

== See also ==
- List of United States Air Force test squadrons
