= 412th Test Wing =

Unit of the US Air Force Test Center at Edwards AFB, CA

412th Test Wing

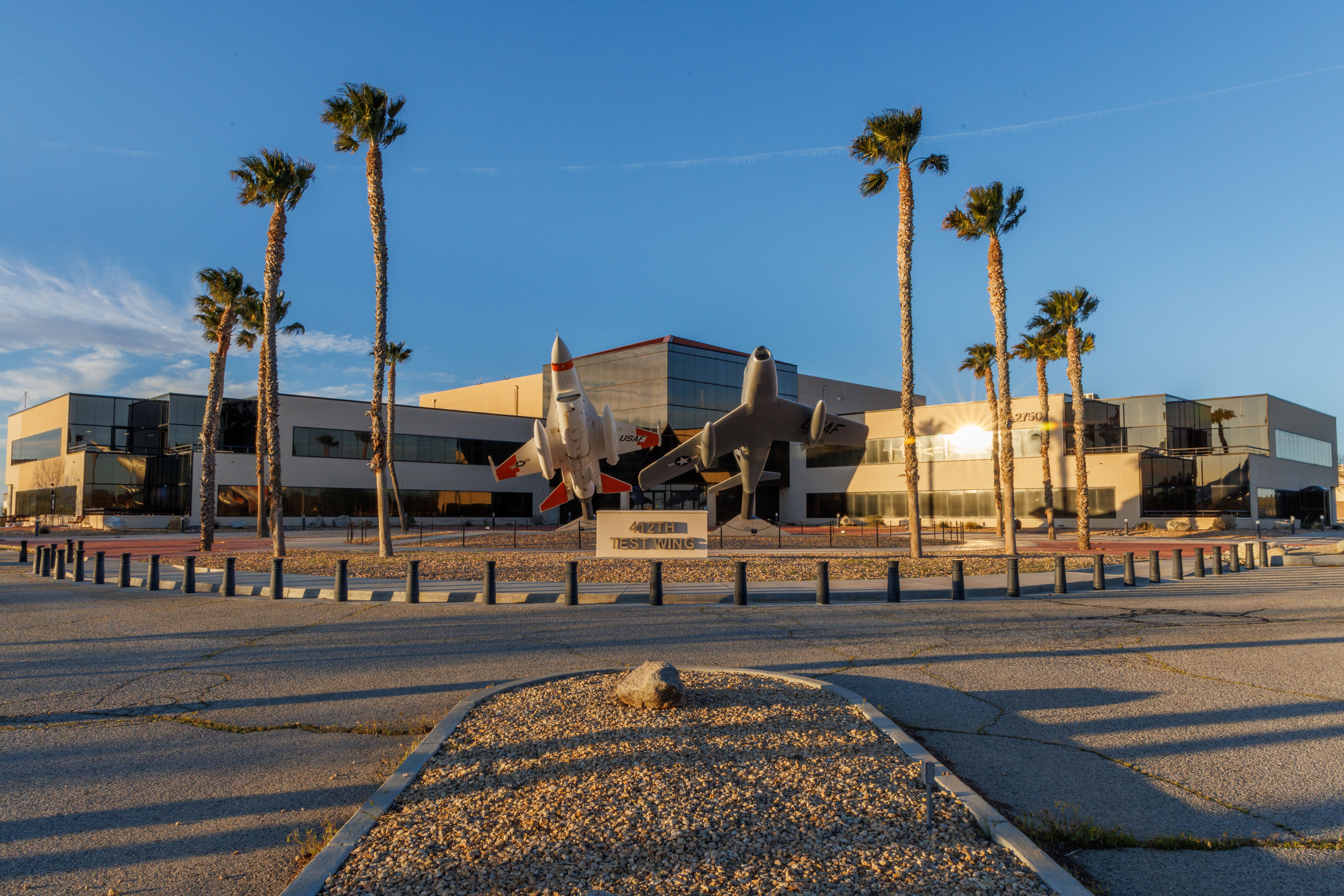
- 412th Test Wing Headquarters at Edwards Air Force Base, California
- Active: 1943–1946; 1955–1960; 1978–present
- Country: United States
- Branch: United States Air Force
- Type: Wing
- Role: Flight testing
- Size: 5,000
- Part of: Air Force Materiel Command
- Garrison/HQ: Edwards Air Force Base, California
- Motto: Proof by Trial
- Decorations: Air Force Outstanding Unit Award
- Website: www.edwards.af.mil/Units

Commanders
- Current commander: Colonel Thomas M. Tauer

Insignia
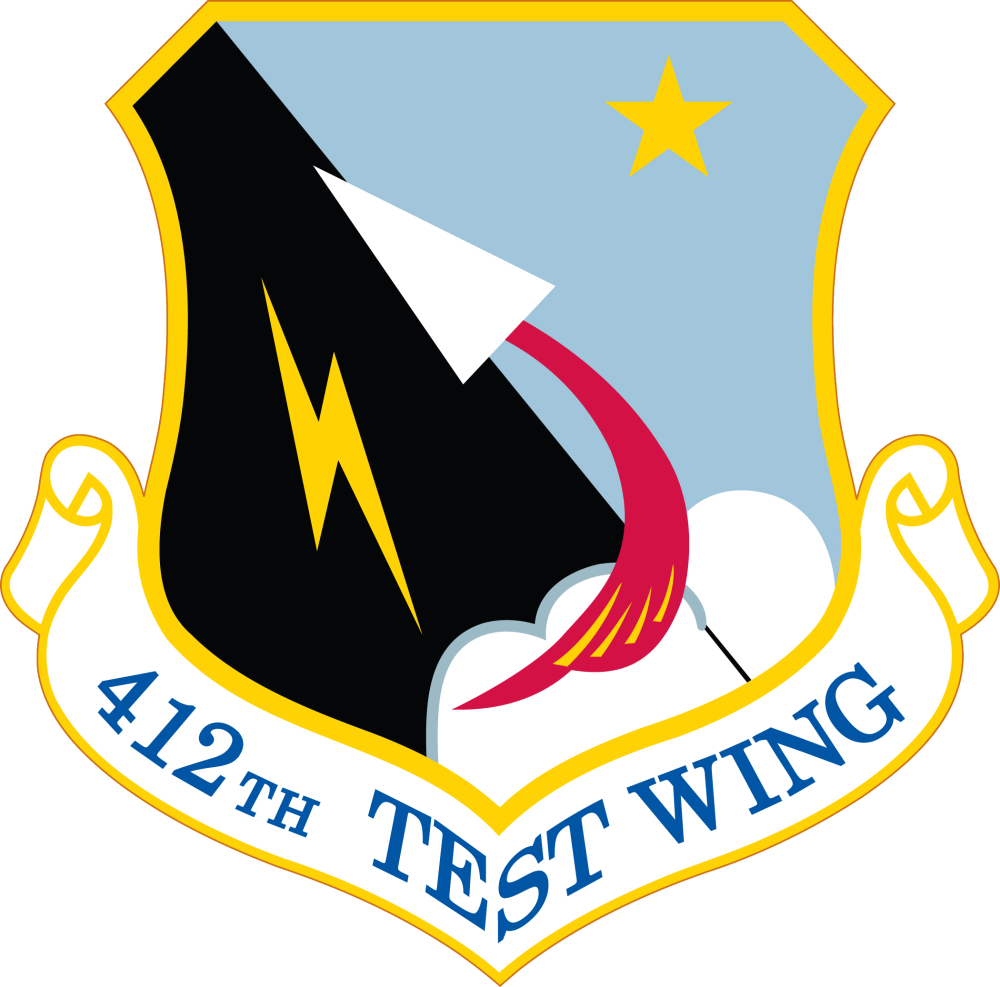
- 412th Test Wing emblem (Note: Approved 22 May 1957.)
- Tail Code: ED
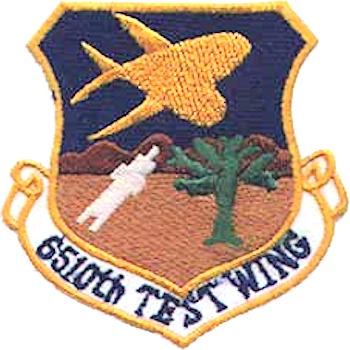
- 6510th Test Wing emblem

The 412th Test Wing is a wing of the United States Air Force, assigned to the Air Force Test Center at Edwards Air Force Base, California. The 412th Test Wing was established in 1972 as the 6510th Test Wing, which assumed the flying mission of the Air Force Flight Test Center upon activation. The wing has performed flight testing of fighter, bomber, mobility, and rotary wing aircraft. In addition, the 412th Test Wing has carried out free-flight testing of space vehicles such as the Space Shuttle.

In 1992, the 6510th Wing was consolidated with the 412th Fighter Group, which was activated during World War II as the first unit in the Army Air Forces to fly jet aircraft. It was inactivated in 1946, transferring its fighters and personnel to another unit. The group was again activated in 1955 to provide air defense on the northern border of the United States, inactivating in 1960 as Strategic Air Command assumed control of its base for use by heavy bombers. (Note: The group was redesignated the 412th Tactical Fighter Group in 1985, but was never active under that name.)

== Mission ==
The 412th Test Wing conducts developmental testing of U.S. Air Force aircraft and systems throughout their lifecycle. It is made up of seven numbered groups and the U. S. Air Force Test Pilot School. As the host wing for Edwards Air Force Base, it also operates and maintains base infrastructure.

The 412th Test Wing plans, conducts, analyzes, and reports on all flight and ground testing of aircraft, weapons systems, software and components as well as modeling and simulation for the USAF. It is also the host wing for Edwards Air Force Base, Calif. – the 2nd largest base in the Air Force. The wing oversees base day-to-day operations and provides support for over 10,000 military, federal civilian and contract personnel assigned to a 470 square mile installation. Approximately 1500 Test Wing Desert Warriors directly support the test and evaluation mission of the Air Force Test Center and the 412th Test Wing.

The wing is responsible for operating the base, including the infrastructure, communication systems, security, fire protection, transportation, supply, finance, contracting, legal services, personnel and manpower support, housing, education, chapel and quality of life programs on a 301,000-acre base in the middle of the Mojave Desert, the second largest base in the U.S. Air Force.

The 412th is host to over 100,000 visitors annually and supports over 25,000 dependents, retirees, and veterans. Major units within the wing include the 412th Mission Support and the 412th Medical Groups, as well the 412th Civil Engineer/Transportation Directorate, 412th Security Forces Squadron and the Services and Comptroller Divisions. Staff agencies include chaplain services, base comptroller, inspector general, manpower and organization, and military equal opportunity and public affairs.

== Units ==
- 412th Operations Group (412 OG)

There are eight flight test squadrons with as many as 20 aircraft assigned to each. The aircraft are grouped by mission
Global Power (fighters and bombers)

411th Flight Test Squadron: (F-22)
416th Flight Test Squadron: (F-16, T-7)
419th Flight Test Squadron: (B-52H, B-1, B-2, C-12)
420th Flight Test Squadron: (B-21)
461st Flight Test Squadron: (F-35 Lightning II)

Global Reach (mobility)

418th Flight Test Squadron: (C-17, KC-135, KC-46)

Global Vigilance (unmanned)

452nd Flight Test Squadron: (RQ-4)

Flying units under the Operations Group are called flight test squadrons and the squadron commander also usually fulfills the role of Combined Test Force, or CTF, Director. (Note: The CTF is an organizational construct that brings together the government developmental test and evaluation personnel (i.e., military personnel and government civilians and support contractors), the operational testers or representatives of the warfighters who will eventually employ the aerospace system in combat, and the contractors who develop and test the aerospace system.)

Members of the CTF formulate the test program, develop the criteria for flight test missions, execute flight test missions, analyze data from the test flights and report on the results. The CTF military personnel, government civilians, and contractors all work together as a team. This concept enables a cheaper, faster, and more effective test program and produces a more effective aerospace system for the warfighter.

Risk is an accepted component of flight testing, but Edwards maintains a stellar safety record due to Edwards' benchmark flight test safety processes. The AFTC's mission focuses on Developmental Test and Evaluation which is the process used to identify risks that need to be reduced or eliminated before fielding new systems. As DT&E is accomplished, aircraft systems transition to Initial Operational Test and Evaluation, or IOT&E where the aircraft are evaluated for combat effectiveness and suitability for an intended mission.

412th Operations Support Squadron (Airfield, Air Traffic Control, Aircrew Flight Equipment, Scheduling, Airdrop, SERE, and the Test Parachutist Program)

- 412th Test Engineering Group (412 TENG)

773d Test Squadron
775th Test Squadron
812th Test Squadron
412th Hypersonic Flight Test Team
412th Range Squadron

- 412th Electronic Warfare Group (412 EWG)

771st Test Squadron
772d Test Squadron

The 412th Engineering and the 412th Electronic Warfare Groups provide the central components in the conduct of the Test and Evaluation mission. They provide the tools, talent and equipment for the core disciplines of aircraft structures, propulsion, avionics and electronic warfare evaluation of the latest weapon system technologies. They are also host to the core facilities that enable flight and ground test with the Range Division, Benefield Anechoic Facility, Integrated Flight Avionics Systems Test Facility and the Air Force Electronic Warfare Evaluation Simulator.

- 412th Maintenance Group (412 MXG)

Through a maintenance group of over 2,000 people and an operations group of 3,000, the 412th Test Wing maintains and flies an average of 90 aircraft with upwards of 30 different aircraft designs and performs over 7,400 missions (over 1,900 test missions) on an annual basis.

- 412th Test Management Division (412 TMD)

Project Management Division
Resource Management Division
Special Projects Branch
Rounding out the test wing are the Project and Resource Management Divisions who provide the foundation for the successful program management of test missions.

- U.S. Air Force Test Pilot School (USAF TPS)

The Test Pilot School, also part of the Test Wing, is where the Air Force pilots, navigators and engineers learn how to conduct flight tests and generate the data needed to carry out test missions. Human lives and millions of dollars depend upon how carefully and successfully a test mission is planned and flown. The comprehensive curriculum of Test Pilot School is the synthesis of decades of successful of flight test and evaluation experience.

== History ==
=== World War II ===
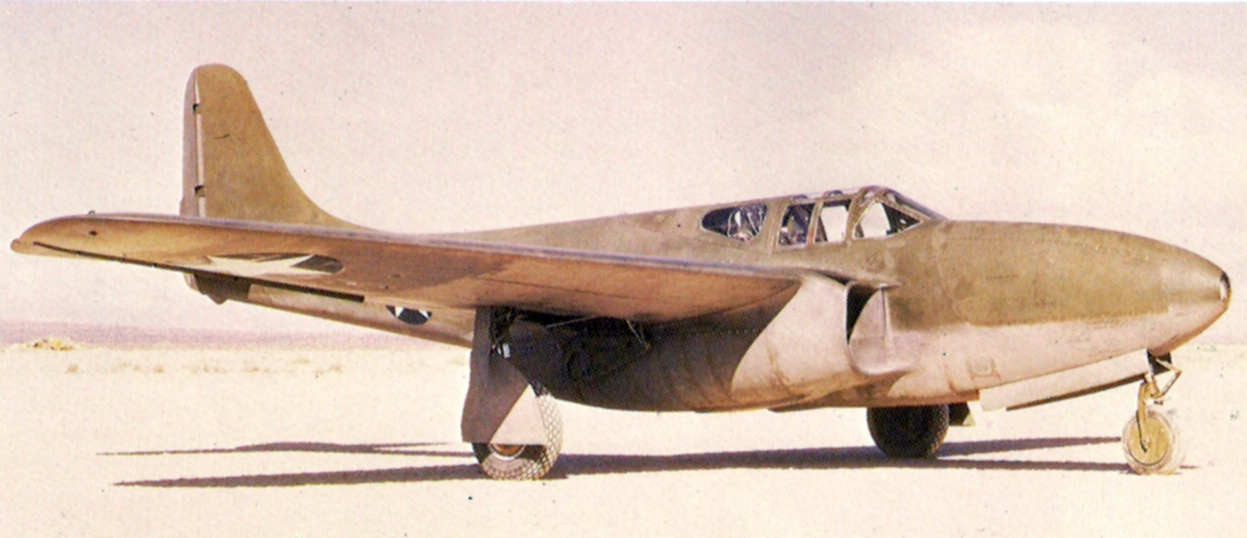
Bell XP-59A being tested by the 412th Fighter Group, 1943

The 412th Test Wing's origins can be traced to 29 November 1943 when the 412th Fighter Group was activated at Muroc Army Air Field, California. Testing of the Bell P-59 Airacomet jet fighter was being conducted at a site on the north shore of Rogers Dry Lakebed, about six miles away from the training base at Muroc.

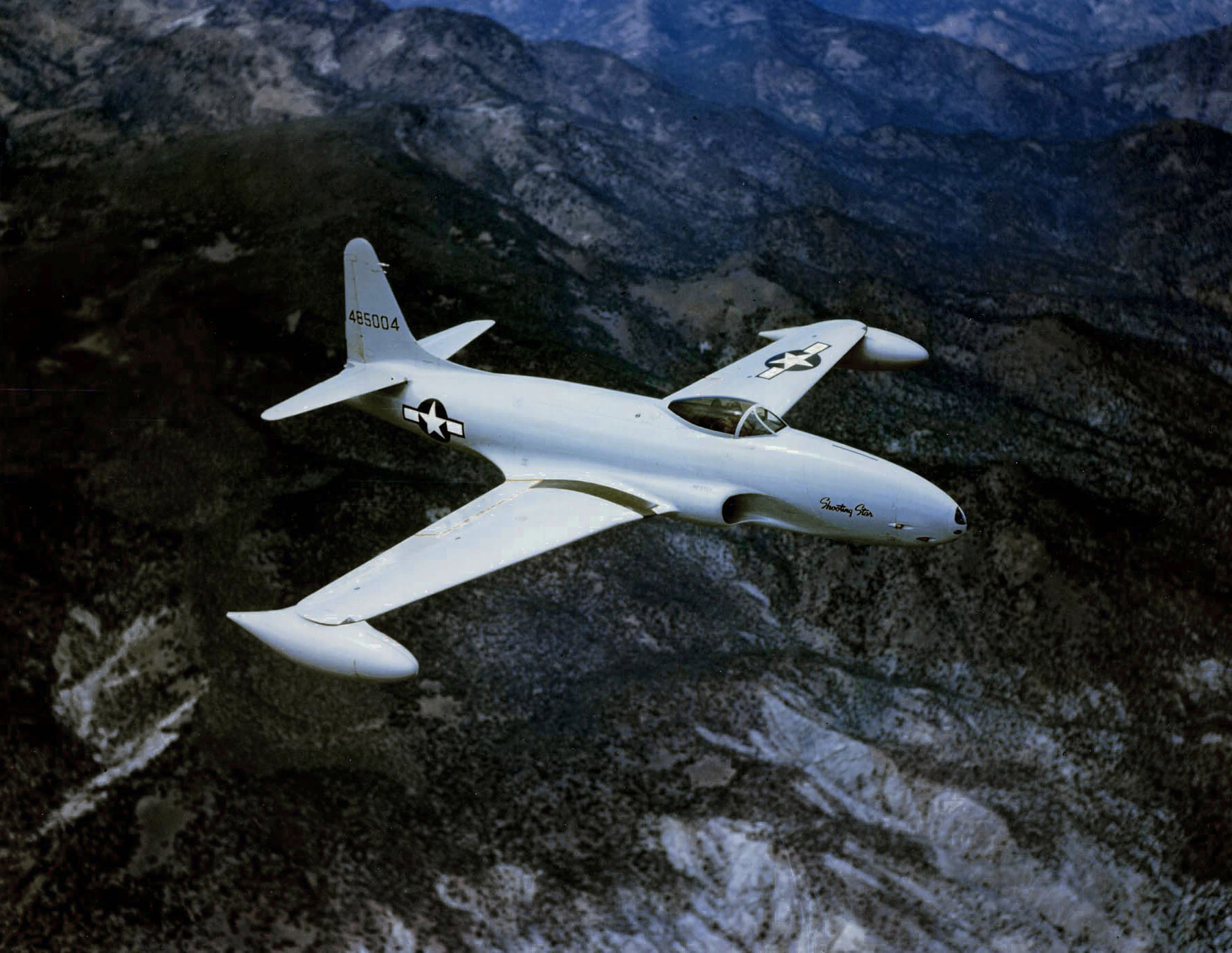
Early Lockheed P-80

The group remained a headquarters-only group until 11 March 1944 when the 445th Fighter Squadron was assigned to begin flying the Airacomet for operational testing. In June, the group moved to Palmdale Army Air Field, California and was brought up to full strength in the summer, when the 29th and 31st Fighter Squadrons were assigned. Its original mission was to conduct tests and engage in experimental aircraft work as part of IV Fighter Command.

The 412th was the first American jet fighter group to be activated. The P-59A was shortly joined by a second jet fighter, the Lockheed XP-80 Shooting Star. As with virtually all of the test programs conducted during the war years, most of the initial flight test work on the XP-59 had been conducted by the contractor. The group developed training programs and trained aircrew and ground personnel as cadres for newly formed jet aircraft-equipped units. Problems with the planes' Allison J33 engines kept the group's Shooting Stars grounded through part of 1945, and the plan's accident rate was twice that of any other fighter in the Army Air Forces inventory.

In November 1945, the group moved to March Field, California, where the 39th Photographic Reconnaissance Squadron was attached to it to begin testing the P-80 as a reconnaissance aircraft. The group was inactivated on 3 July 1946 and its mission, personnel and jet aircraft were transferred to the 1st Fighter Group.

=== Air Defense Command ===
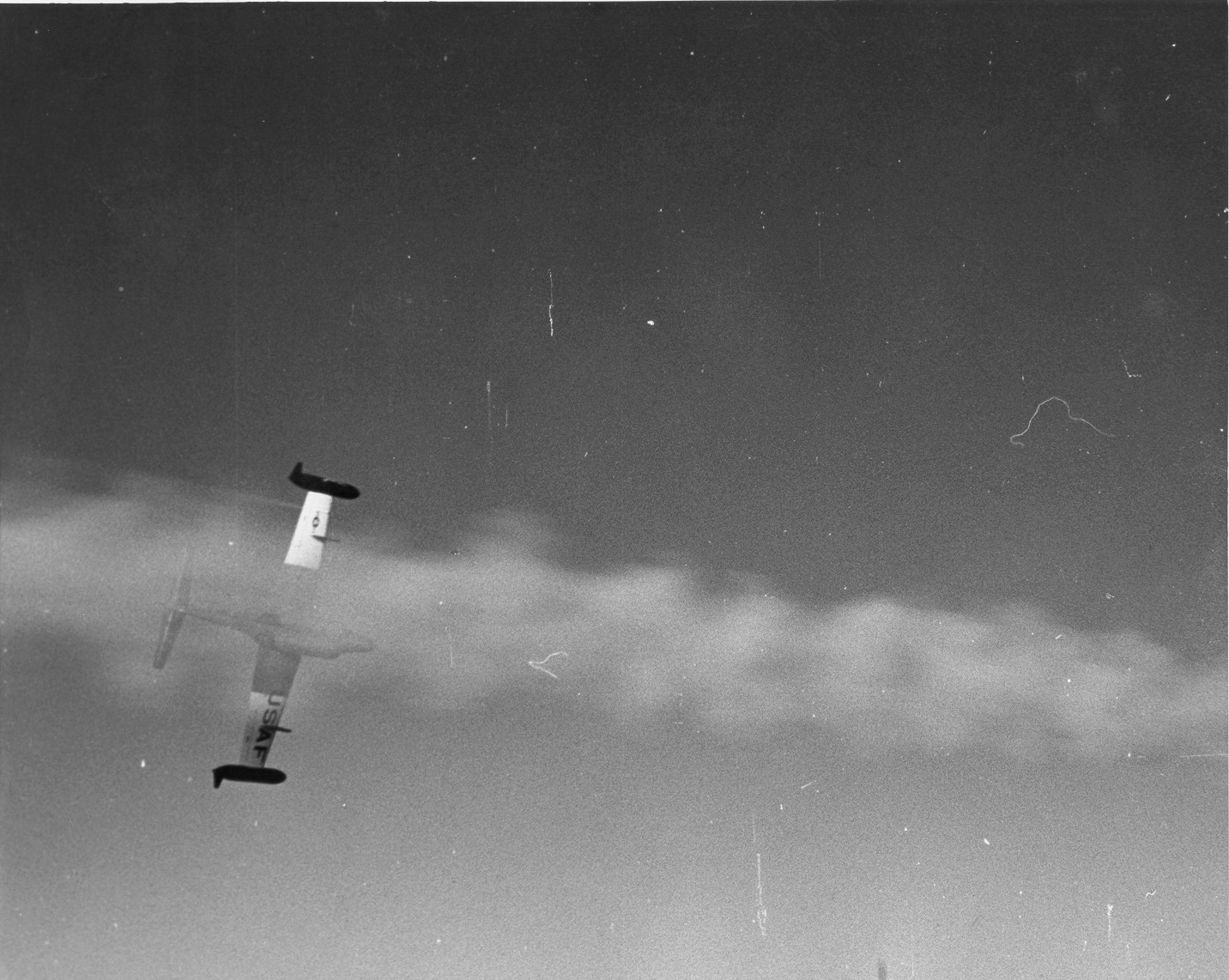
F-89J firing a live nuclear tipped Genie missile

On 18 August 1955 the 412th Fighter Group (Air Defense) was activated by Air Defense Command (ADC) at Wurtsmith Air Force Base, Michigan, where it assumed the mission, personnel and equipment of the 527th Air Defense Group, which was simultaneously inactivated. This action was part of ADC's Project Arrow, which was designed to bring back on the active list the fighter units which had compiled memorable records in the two world wars. The 445th Fighter-Interceptor Squadron moved from Geiger Field, Washington and assumed the Northrop F-89D Scorpions of the 527th's 87th Fighter-Interceptor Squadron, since Project Arrow also reunited fighter squadrons with their traditional group headquarters. These two seat interceptor aircraft were radar equipped and armed with Mighty Mouse rockets. The 412th was also assigned several support organizations as the host for active duty USAF units at Wurtsmith.

The mission of the group was the air defense of the Upper Great Lakes region. In March 1956 the group's 445th Squadron became the first unit in ADC to convert to the F-89H, which could carry the GAR-1 Falcon in addition to Mighty Mouse rockets. The squadron soon upgraded to the F-89J. On 1 January 1957 the 412th became one of the first two groups in ADC to place its F-89Js armed with 2 nuclear MB-1 Genie missiles, one under each wing, on alert. These aircraft were on thirty-minute "standby alert" in addition to the 412th's requirement to maintain aircraft on five-minute alert armed with conventional weapons. Alert aircraft armed with Genies could not be launched to identify unknown aircraft unless at DEFCON 1.

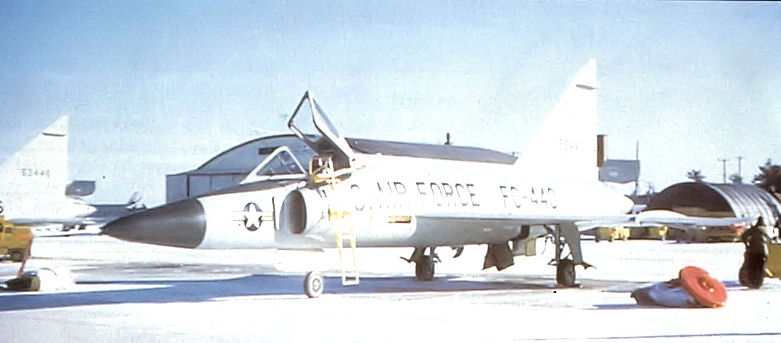
31st Fighter-Interceptor Squadron F-102 (Note: Aircraft is Convair F-102A-80-CO Delta Dagger serial 56-1440. Taken in 1957 at Wurtsmuth AFB, Michigan.)

On 8 June 1956 the group expanded when a second fighter squadron, the 31st Fighter-Interceptor Squadron was activated. The 31st flew the single seat Convair F-102 Delta Dagger, which, like the later model F-89s of the 445th, was equipped with data link for interception control through the Semi-Automatic Ground Environment system. However the 31st remained at Wurtsmith only briefly, before swapping places with the 18th Fighter-Interceptor Squadron and moving to Elmendorf Air Force Base, Alaska on 20 August 1957, while the 18th moved from Ladd Air Force Base, Alaska to Wurtsmith.

Strategic Air Command (SAC) believed its bases with large concentrations of Boeing B-52 Stratofortress bombers made attractive targets for Soviet missiles. SAC's response was to break up its wings and scatter their aircraft over a larger number of bases, thus making it more difficult for the Soviet Union to knock out the entire fleet with a surprise first strike. As part of this dispersal, SAC established the 4026th Strategic Wing at Wurtsmith in 1958 and the base expanded to accept bombers and tankers.

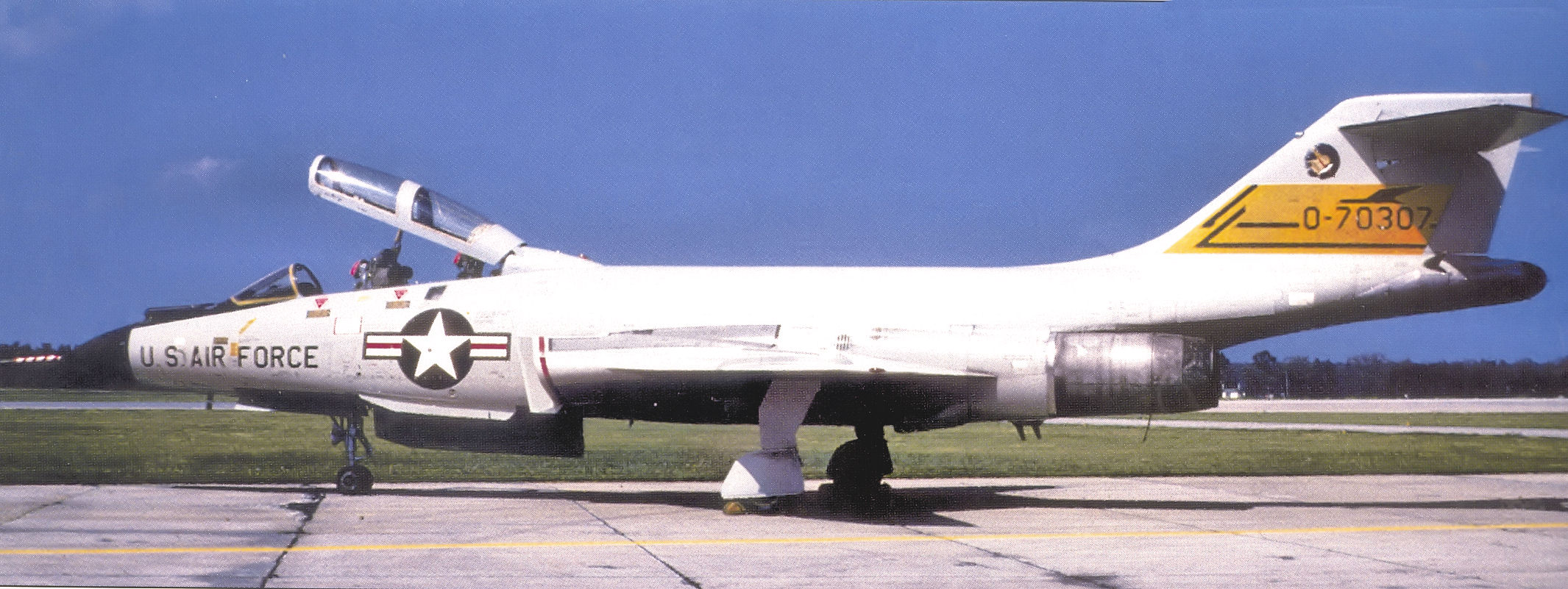
445th Fighter-Interceptor Squadron F-101B

1960 saw a series of changes for the group. In January, the 445th Squadron traded its Scorpions for supersonic McDonnell F-101 Voodoos. SAC's expanding mission saw the transfer of Wurtsmith to its jurisdiction on 1 April, along with all support units. The impending move of the 18th Fighter-Interceptor Squadron to Grand Forks Air Force Base would leave only one fighter squadron on the base. As a result, the 412th Fighter Group was inactivated and the 445th Fighter-Interceptor Squadron was reassigned to the Sault Sainte Marie Air Defense Sector.

=== USAF flight testing ===
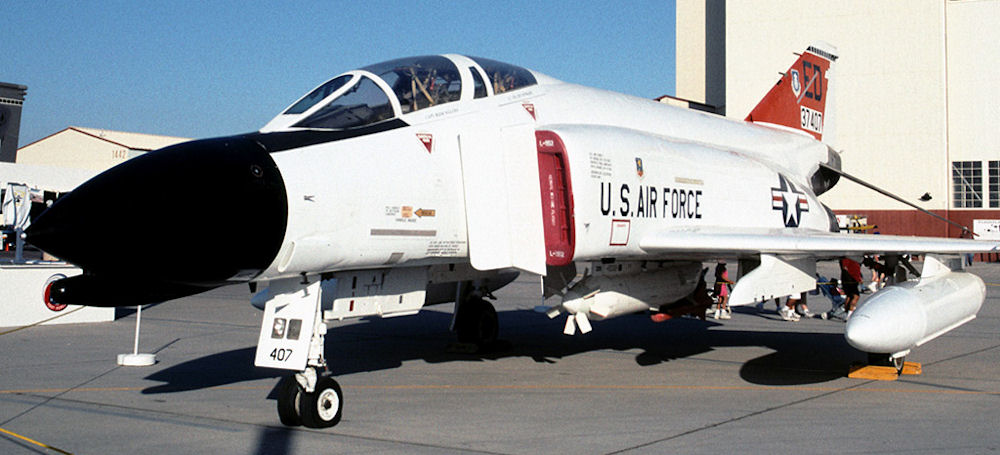
6512th Test Squadron F-4 Phantom II (Note: This aircraft is the first USAF F-4 Phantom II, McDonnell F-4C-15-MC Phantom serial 63-7407. Shown about 1990 just before its retirement.)

On 1 March 1978, the 6510th Test Wing was established and activated at Edwards Air Force Base, California as part of a re-organization of units at Edwards by Air Force Systems Command. The 6510th assumed the flying mission of the Air Force Flight Test Center, which was established in June 1951. The new wing had a long, established history at Edwards, having been the base host unit since the establishment of the USAF Flight Test Center.

In the late 1970s, the Wing flew flight tests on the McDonnell Douglas F-15C Eagle with its advanced engine and fire-control system; the single-engine F-16C Fighting Falcon with its revolutionary, "fly-by-wire" flight control system; and the Rockwell B-1A and the later Rockwell B-1B Lancer in the 1980s with its multitude of highly sophisticated offensive and defensive systems. These planes more than bore out the prophecy concerning the ever-increasing importance of systems testing and integration. At a remote location in 1978 and 1979, an AFFTC test pilot and a pair of flight test engineers were engaged in proof-of-concept testing with Lockheed's "low-observable" technology demonstrator, dubbed "Have Blue." The successful conduct of these tests led immediately to the development of a new subsonic attack aircraft that was designated the F-117A Nighthawk.

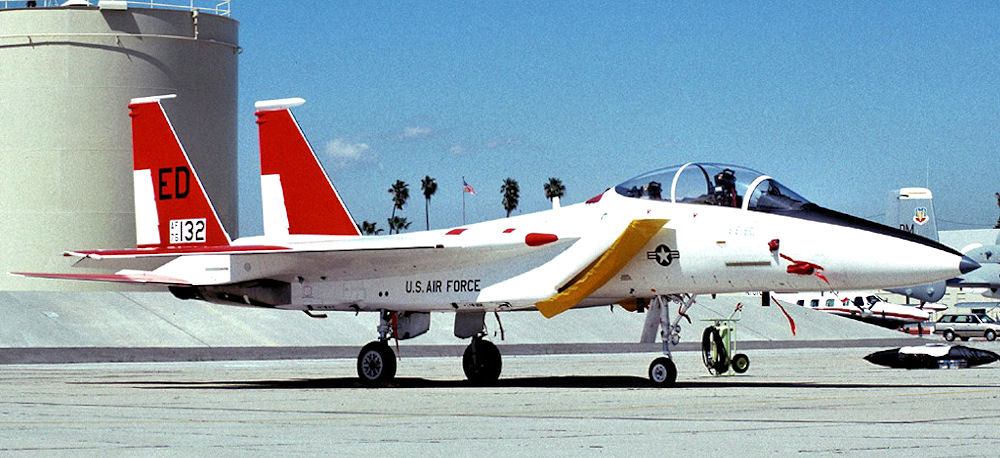
6512th Test Squadron F-15B (Note: Aircraft is McDonnell Douglas F-15B Eagle serial 76-132. It was transferred in 2006 to the 46th Test Wing at Eglin AFB, Florida.)

The wing performed free-flight testing of the Space Shuttle for NASA from 1978 to 1980, and in April 1981 recovered the shuttle Columbia following the first-ever orbital mission of a reusable spacecraft. The wing continued to provide alternate landing site services for STS recovery for many years, including for the 'Atlantis' during the STS-117 mission in June 2007.

The dual-role F-15E Strike Eagle was developed in the 1980s and went on to demonstrate remarkable combat effectiveness in the 1991 Persian Gulf conflict. The Low Altitude Navigation and Targeting Infrared for Night, system revolutionized air-to-ground combat operations during the Gulf War by denying Saddam Hussein's forces the once comforting sanctuary of night. The wing deployed support personnel and equipment to the Middle East for Operation Desert Shield and Operation Desert Storm from August 1990 – March 1991. While deployed, it performed tests on radar and weapons system accuracy.

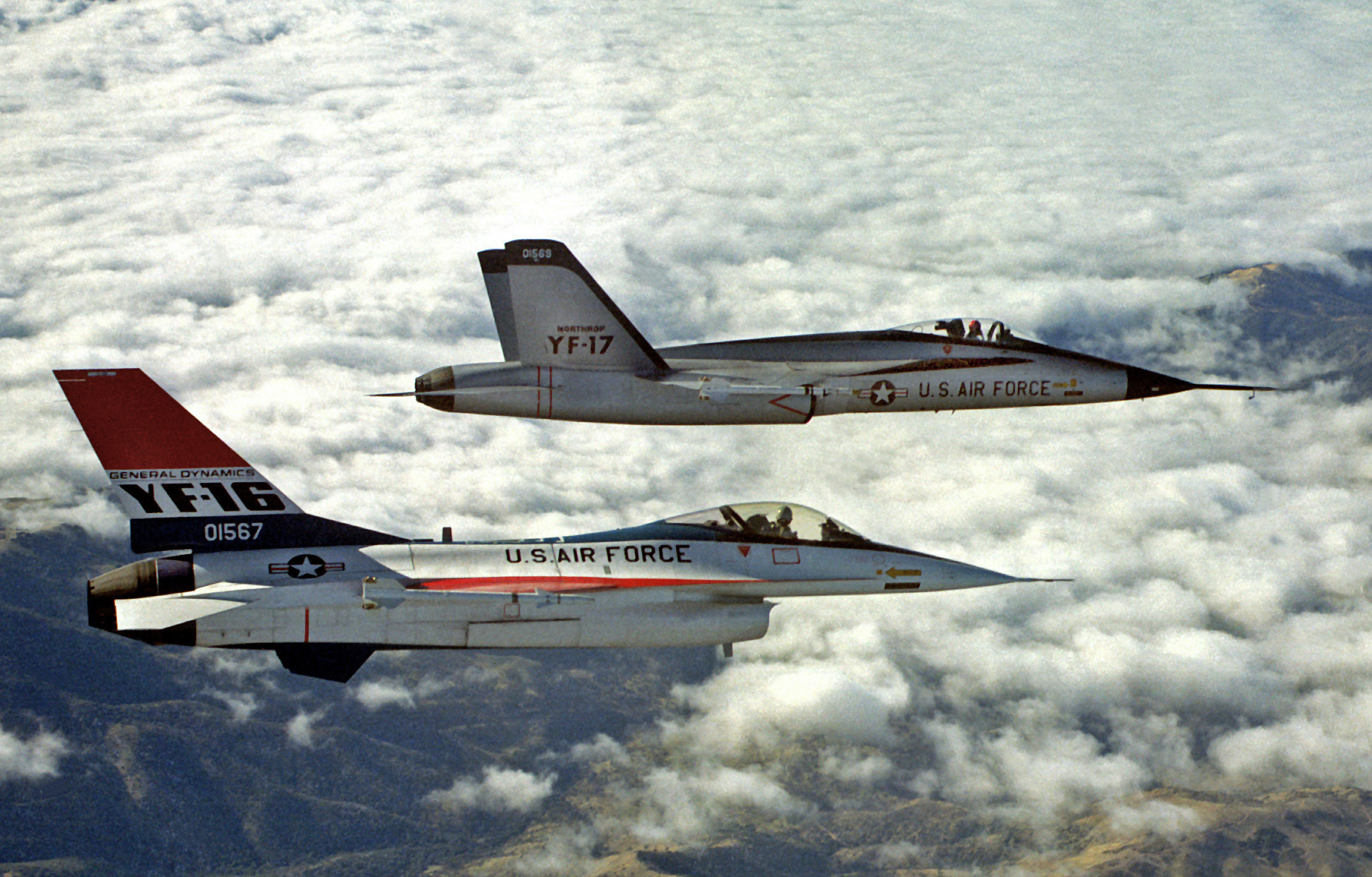
YF-16 and YF-17 during their competitive fly-off in 1974 (Note: Over 4,000 production F-16s were built after the competition. The YF-17 was the basis for the highly successful United States Navy F/A-18 Hornet.)

The late 1980s also witnessed the arrival of the first giant flying wing to soar over the base in nearly 40 years. The thin silhouette, compound curves and other low-observable characteristics of the B-2 Spirit bomber represented third-generation stealth technology, following the SR-71 and F-117. In June 1992, Air Force Systems Command was inactivated, being replaced by Air Force Materiel Command (AFMC). AFMC replaced the 4-digit AFSC 6510th Test Wing on 2 October 1992 by reactivating the 412th Test Wing, which assumed the mission, personnel and equipment of the 6510th. The 412th also was consolidated with the 6510th, which preserved the history and honors of the provisional AFSC unit since its establishment in 1978.

In the early 1990s, AFSC received YF-22A and the YF-23A Advanced Tactical Fighters.

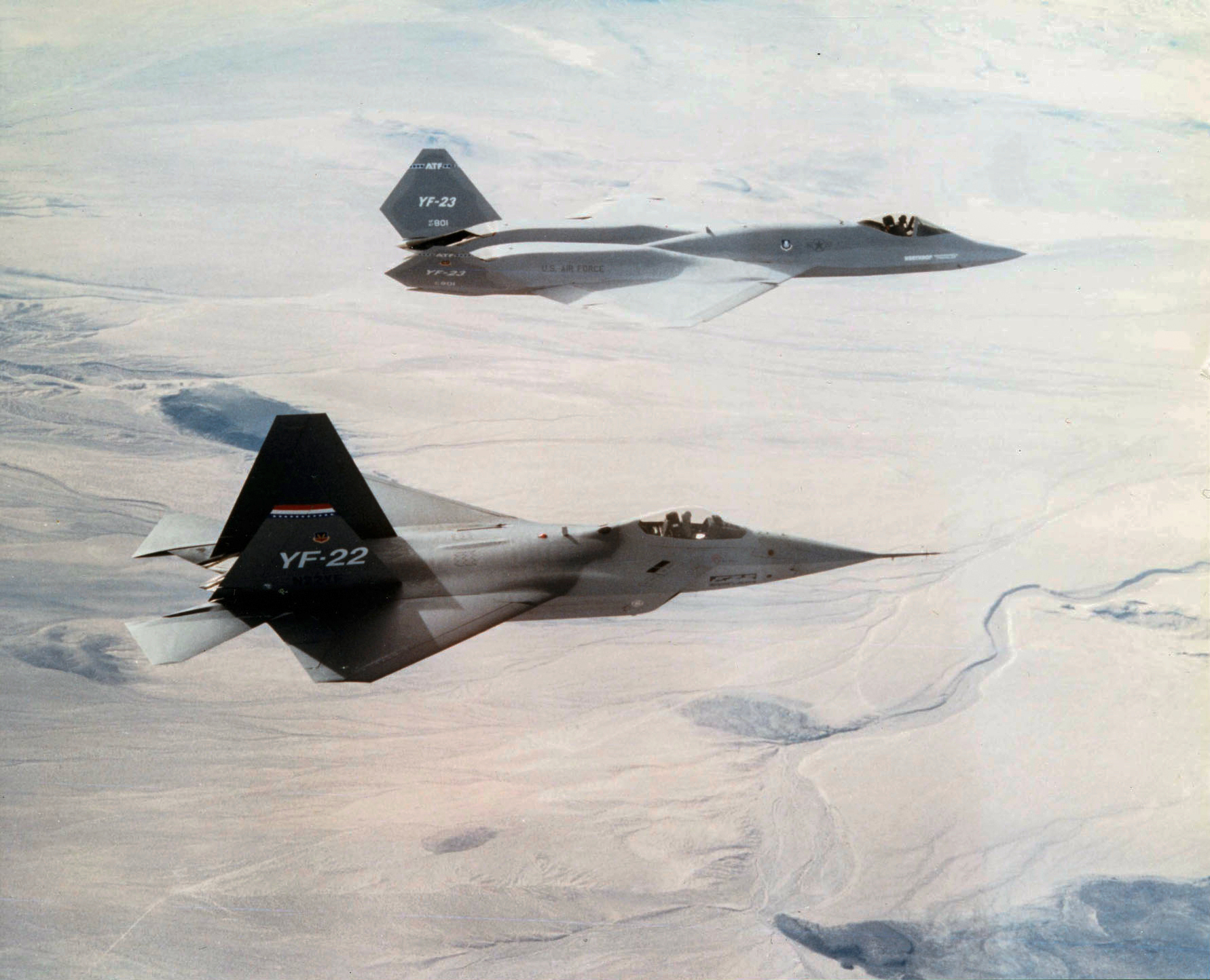
Prototype YF-22 and YF-23 fighters, 1991

The two prototype fighters were the first airplanes to blend stealth technology with agility and high-speed, supersonic cruise capability. The YF-22A was selected to become the Air Force's new advanced tactical fighter after a brief demonstration and validation risk reduction flight test program. Now named the Raptor, the F-22A continues to undergo test and evaluation by the Wing's 411th Flight Test Squadron. A new group of research projects came to the 412th TW in the 1990s. RQ-4 Global Hawk, an unmanned aerial vehicle that has been used extensively in Operation Enduring Freedom (Afghanistan) and Operation Iraqi Freedom (Iraq), made its first flight at Edwards in February 1998 and has gone on to fill a critical role in the global war on terrorism. The Martin Marietta X-24A, Lockheed Martin X-33, Orbital Sciences X-34 and X-38 Space Station Crew Return Vehicle, a series of new lifting bodies, technology demonstrators and half-scale models that might make space flight, research and development safer and more economical, were tested at Edwards by NASA.

Other projects of the 412th included XF-35A Lightning II and Boeing X-32, competing models for the Joint Strike Fighter program, made their first flights in September and October 2000. The X-35A won the competition in 2001 and will eventually be built in various versions for America's flying armed services and for foreign air forces as well. Also new are the Airborne Laser Program and several Unmanned Aerial Vehicle Programs.

== Lineage ==
412th Fighter Group

- Constituted as the 412th Fighter Group (Single Engine) on 20 November 1943

Activated on 29 November 1943
Inactivated on 3 July 1946

- Redesignated 412th Fighter Group (Air Defense) on 20 June 1955

Activated on 18 August 1955
Discontinued on 1 April 1960

- Redesignated 412th Tactical Fighter Group on 31 July 1985
- Consolidated with the 6510th Test Wing as the 6510th Test Wing on 1 October 1992

412th Test Wing

- Established as the 6510th Test Wing on 1 March 1978
- Consolidated with the 412th Tactical Fighter Group on 1 October 1992

Redesignated 412th Test Wing on 2 October 1992

=== Assignments ===
- IV Fighter Command, 29 November 1943
- 321st Wing (Special), 3 December 1945
- IV Fighter Command, 28 January 1946
- Tactical Air Command, 21 March 1946
- Twelfth Air Force, 15 May – 3 July 1946
- 4708th Air Defense Wing, 18 August 1955
- 30th Air Division, 8 July 1956 – 1 April 1960 ) attached to Detroit Air Defense Sector after 1 April 1959)
- Air Force Flight Test Center (later Air Force Test Center), 1 March 1978 – present

=== Components ===
Groups

- 412th Operations Group: 1 October 1993 – present
- 6510th Test Group (later 412th Test Group): 10 March 1989 – 30 September 1993
- 6545th Test Group (later 545th Test Group): 1 January 1979 – 1 August 1996

Squadrons
World War II/Cold War

- 18th Fighter-Interceptor Squadron: 20 August 1957 – 1 April 1960
- 29th Fighter Squadron: 21 July 1944 – 3 July 1946
- 31st Fighter Squadron (later 31 Fighter-Interceptor Squadron): 19 August 1944 – 3 July 1946; 8 June 1956 – 20 August 1957
- 39 Photographic Reconnaissance Squadron (later, 39 Tactical Reconnaissance Squadron: attached 5 November 1945 – 3 July 1946
- 445th Fighter Squadron (later 445 Fighter-Interceptor Squadron): 18 March 1944 – 3 July 1946; 18 August 1955 – 1 April 1960

Flight Testing

- 6510th (later 410th Flight Test Squadron): 10 March 1989 – 1 August 2008 (B-1B, F-117A)
- 6511th (later 411th Flight Test Squadron): 10 March 1989 – Present (YF-22, YF-23)
- 412th Flight Test Squadron, 1 January 1994 – Present (C-135C Speckled Trout)
- 6513th (later 413th Flight Test Squadron): 1 December 1977 – 6 May 2004
- 6515th (later 415th Flight Test Squadron): 10 March 1989 – 1 October 1993 (F-15)
- 6516th (later 416th Flight Test Squadron): 10 March 1989 – Present (F-16)
- 6517th (later 417th Flight Test Squadron): 10 March 1989 – 1 October 2005; 16 March 2006 – 14 February 2012 (C-17, YAL-1)
- 6518th (later 418th Flight Test Squadron): 10 March 1989 – Present (C-130 and special operations variants; CV-22; KC-135 and special variants; C-17A)
- 6519th (later 419th Flight Test Squadron): 10 March 1989 – Present (B-52H, B-1, B-2)
- 6520th (later 420th Flight Test Squadron): 10 March 1989 – 30 December 1997 (B-2)
- 6512th (later 445th Flight Test Squadron): 1 October 1969 – 30 November 2001; 11 March 2004 – Present (Initial Flight Test Operations of more than 100 aircraft)
- 452d Flight Test Squadron: 1 October 1993 – Present (EC-18B, YAL-1, RQ-4B)
- 461st Flight Test Squadron: 27 October 2006 – Present (F-35)
- 6514th Test Squadron: 5 May 1970 – 18 September 1973 (UAV/Drones)

Schools

- U.S. Air Force Test Pilot School: 1 March 1978 – present

=== Stations ===
- Muroc Army Air Field, California, 29 November 1943
- Palmdale Army Air Field, California, 1 June 1944
- Bakersfield Municipal Airport, California, 11 October 1944
- Santa Maria Army Air Field, California, 10 July 1945
- March Field, California, c. 29 November 1945 – 3 July 1946
- Wurtsmith Air Force Base, Michigan, 18 August 1955 – 1 April 1960
- Edwards Air Force Base, California, 1 March 1978 – present

=== Aircraft assigned ===
- Bell P-63 King Cobra (1944)
- North American P-51 Mustang (1944–1945)
- Bell P-59 Airacomet (1944–1945)
- Lockheed P-80A Shooting Star (1945–1946)
- Northrop F-89D, F-89H, F-89J Scorpion (1955–1960)
- Lockheed T-33 T-Bird (1955–1960)
- Convair F-102 Delta Dagger (1956–1960)
- McDonnell F-101 Voodoo (1959–1960)

==== Tested from 1974 to 1992 ====
- A-7 Corsair II
- A-10 Thunderbolt II
- A-37 Dragonfly
- B-1 Lancer
- B-2 Spirit
- B-52 Stratofortress
- C-17 Globemaster III
- C-23 Sherpa
- C-130 Hercules (several variants)
- NC-131 Samaritan
- F-4 Phantom II
- Northrop YF-23 Black Widow II
- F-15 Eagle
- F-16 Falcon
- F-111 Aardvark
- HH-60 Pave Hawk
- HH-53 Super Jolly Green Giant
- KC-135 Stratotanker
- T-33 Shooting Star
- T-38 Talon
- T-39 Sabreliner
- T-46 Eaglet
- Space Shuttle
- Lockheed Have Blue - Stealth demonstration platform

==== Tested from 1993 – present ====
- C-130 Hercules (several variants)
- F-16 Falcon
- T-38 Talon
- T-39 Sabreliner
- B-2 Spirit
- B-21 Raider
- B-52 Stratofortress
- C-17 Globemaster III
- F-22 Raptor
- B-1 Lancer
- U-2 Dragon Lady
- C-18 Stratoliner
- C-135 Stratolifter (several variants)
- F-35 Lightning II
- RQ-4 Global Hawk
- Boeing X-32

== See also ==
- F-89 Scorpion units of the United States Air Force
