= Steven M. Rainey =

American test pilot

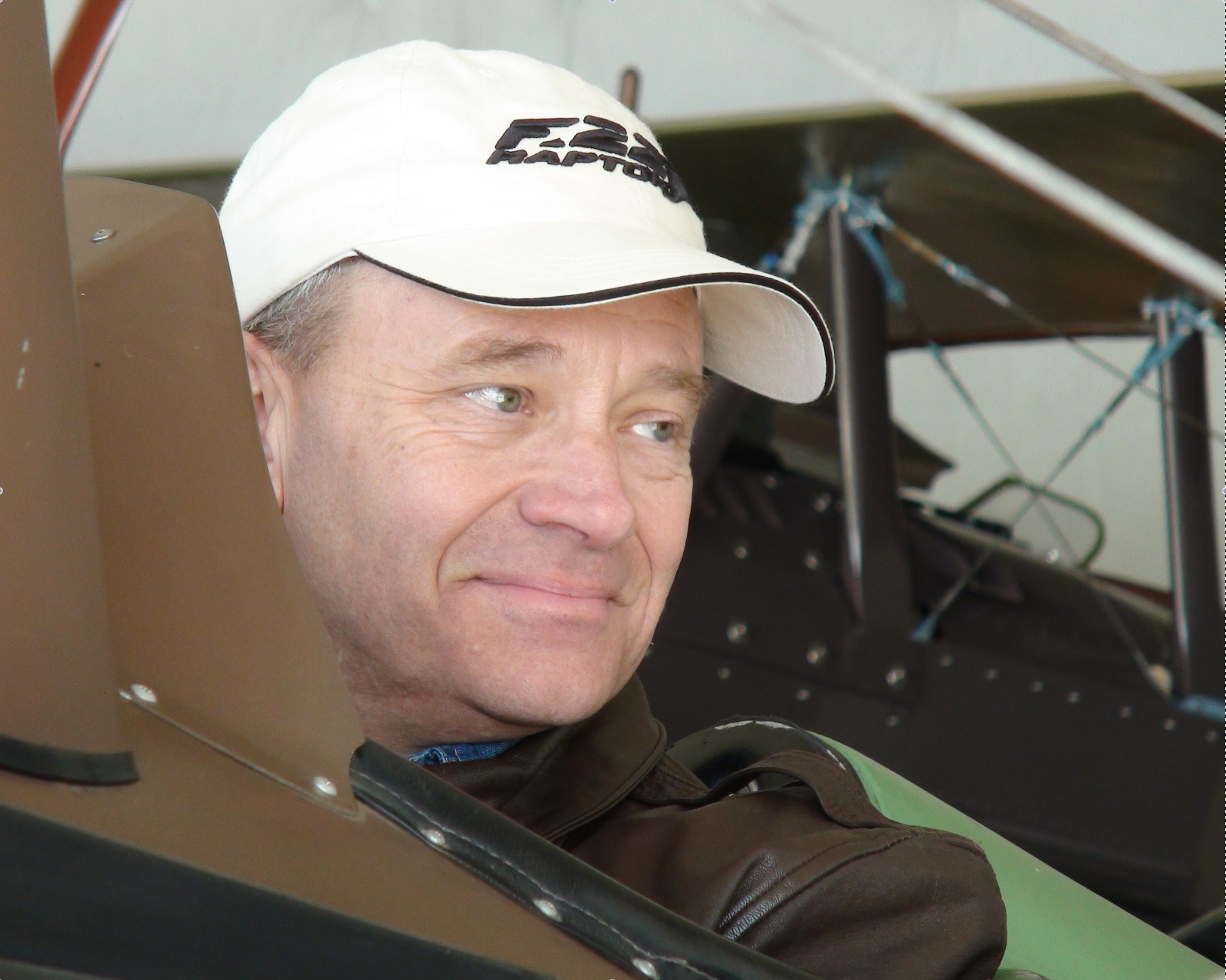
- Rainey in 2010
- Military career
- Branch: United States Air Force
- Service years: 1980–2000
- Rank: Lt. Colonel
- Nickname: Hooter
- Commands: 411th Flight Test Squadron
- Conflicts: Cold War
- Other work: F-22 Chief Test Pilot

Steven M. Rainey is a test pilot and retired United States Air Force (USAF) officer. As of 2022, he is a test pilot for Stratolaunch Systems working on the Scaled Composites Stratolaunch aircraft. Previously, he was Lockheed Martin's chief F-22 test pilot, Boeing's lead F-22 test pilot, and commander of the USAF 411th Flight Test Squadron. He is noted for a number of achievements while flight testing the Lockheed Martin F-22 Raptor. He was the first USAF pilot to fly the aircraft, the first pilot to perform aerial refueling in the F-22, and the first pilot to fly cross-country in the Raptor.

Rainey was the president of the Society of Experimental Test Pilots for 2012 and is a fellow of the organization.

== Military career ==
Rainey attended the United States Air Force Academy and graduated in 1980 with a degree in Engineering Mechanics. He attended undergraduate pilot training at Vance Air Force Base in Oklahoma. Rainey was stationed at Ramstein Air Base in Germany where he flew the McDonnell Douglas F-4 Phantom II.

After service in Europe, Rainey was assigned to Eglin Air Force Base in Florida, where he performed flight testing on the F-4 and General Dynamics F-16 Fighting Falcon. In 1990, he graduated from the University of Miami with a master's degree in mechanical engineering. He was selected to attend the United States Naval Test Pilot School in Patuxent River, Maryland and graduated in 1991. After test pilot school, Rainey was assigned to the F-16 Combined Test Force at Edwards Air Force Base in California where he tested avionics upgrades and new subsystems including the HARM Targeting System.

=== F-22 flight testing ===
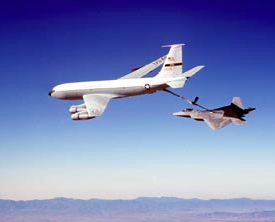
Rainey was the first pilot to perform air refueling in the F-22

In 1994, Rainey joined the F-22 system program office and two years later was assigned as operations officer for the F-22 Combined Test Force (CTF)—the joint USAF/contractor group that led all F-22 flight test operations. He evaluated the Boeing life support system that was specially developed to counter the effects of high g-loading produced by the highly maneuverable fighter. Included in Rainey's assessment was the HGU-86/P helmet that contained numerous improvements over earlier models including a more secure fit, active noise reduction, and better protection in the event of ejection. Rainey described the helmet as "one of the lightest and most comfortable" he had ever used.

On September 7, 1997, Rainey flew one of the chase aircraft supporting the F-22 first flight from Dobbins Air Reserve Base in Marietta, Georgia. Rainey and Lockheed test pilot Jon Beesley took off first in their F-16s and circled around to join up with F-22 chief test pilot Paul Metz flying Raptor 01—the first of nine aircraft built during the Engineering and Manufacturing Development (EMD) phase. The F-22's rate of climb exceeded expectations making it difficult for Rainey and Beesley to keep up. During the successful fifty-eight-minute flight, Metz evaluated engine power settings, landing gear operation, and formation flying qualities. After a second test flight, Raptor 01 arrived at Edwards AFB on February 5, 1998, carried aboard a Lockheed C-5 Galaxy for additional testing in which Rainey would play a significant role.

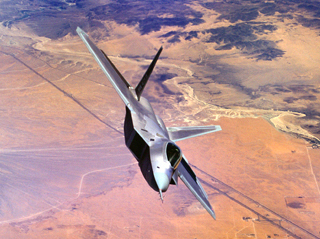
Raptor 02, piloted by Rainey, on the F-22 program's first cross continental flight

On May 17, 1998, he became the first Air Force pilot to fly the F-22 during a mission to evaluate flying qualities, speed brake handling, and formation flying. The eighty-minute mission in Raptor 01 was considered the start of formal flight test for the EMD phase of the program. On June 29, 1998, at the Lockheed plant in Marietta, Rainey flew chase for Metz during the first flight of the second EMD aircraft—Raptor 02.

On July 30, 1998, Rainey became the first pilot to perform air-to-air refueling in an F-22, taking Raptor 01 on a ninety-minute mission with a Boeing KC-135 Stratotanker from the 452d Flight Test Squadron. Rainey and the refueling crew tested the characteristics of the F-22's refueling system and verified the limits of safe operation. The test was a success, and Rainey reported the F-22 was "extremely stable with outstanding flying qualities."

Less than a month later, Rainey flew Raptor 02 from Marietta, Georgia to Edwards Air Force Base on the first non-stop cross-country flight for an F-22. Accompanied by chase aircraft and tankers, the 4.5 hour flight ended successfully at noon on August 26, 1998, adding a second Raptor to the CTF test program. Rainey summed up his experience by stating, "It's the best flying aircraft I have flown, and it sets a new standard of excellence in fighter aviation."

At the 42nd annual symposium of the Society of Experimental Test Pilots held in September 1999, Rainey and Lt. Colonel Allen Kohn updated their peers on the status of the F-22 test program. The presentation summarized the envelope expansion testing of the last year and provided insight into the integration challenges of an aircraft where software is involved in nearly every action, including lowering the landing gear.

In 1999, Rainey starred in Pushing the Envelope, the third episode of the Test Pilots documentary series created by The Learning Channel. Narrated by actor Alec Baldwin, this show discussed the risks involved with flight testing using Rainey's F-22 test experience as an example.

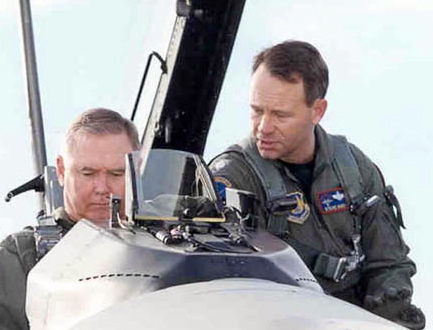
Rainey briefs CSAF Michael Ryan prior to flying chase for an F-22 mission

In January 2000, after Rainey assumed command of the 411th Flight Test Squadron, Secretary of the Air Force F. Whitten Peters visited the F-22 Combined Test Force. Rainey and fellow test pilot David Nelson gave Peters a personal tour of the aircraft.

During a January 2000 visit by the USAF Chief of Staff, Rainey and General Michael Ryan supported an F-22 test mission by flying alongside in F-16s. Ryan remarked that the hour-long flight left him "even more rabid" about the Air Force's new air superiority fighter. Weeks later, during a visit to Tuzla Air Base in Bosnia-Herzegovina, the chase flight with Rainey was still fresh in Ryan's mind. Ryan's enthusiastic description of the F-22's performance relative to the F-16 that he flew left the audience in awe.

On March 15, 2000, a third F-22 arrived at Edwards with a fourth due later that year. Rainey noted the effect the F-22's increasing maturity had on the pilot training program. New pilots, such as Lt. Colonel Bill Craig who delivered aircraft 4003, would arrive in increasing numbers to support the test program's needs. Rainey also expressed excitement at the arrival of aircraft 4004 that would allow CTF personnel to evaluate the integrated avionics suite and the promise of allowing a pilot to become "a tactician rather than a housekeeper." Rainey retired from the Air Force later that year with the rank of lieutenant colonel.

== Civilian career ==
After twenty years of military service, Rainey transitioned to commercial aviation as a pilot for American Airlines. Three years later, he returned to Edwards AFB after accepting a pilot position in the United States civil service.

=== Boeing ===
In 2005, Rainey joined Boeing Defense, Space & Security as the company's lead test pilot for the F-22. He participated in many testing activities including the initial missions to verify the aircraft could safely carry the GBU-39 Small Diameter Bomb.

All of the sensor information has been fused into a single picture for the pilot. Information is what is going to be the key to success on the battlefield.

— Rainey on the F-22's avionics

Rainey has been a strong advocate for the F-22. On November 14, 2006, he described the aircraft's performance at the Aerospace Testing Exposition in Anaheim, California. Rainey and fellow test pilots, David Cooley, James Brown, and Bret Luedke toured the United States giving demonstrations of the F-22 cockpit simulator to raise awareness and support for the aircraft. After Cooley was killed flying an F-22 test mission, Rainey fondly remembered his friend as "a consummate professional and a true leader"

Cadets from the USAF Academy come to Edwards AFB to receive instruction in aviation sciences and airmanship. Rainey participated in these events by providing orientation flights for cadets such as sophomore Callie Brown. In March 2008, Brown received her orientation flight in an F-16 piloted by Rainey. This flight was especially memorable for Rainey because cadet Brown is the daughter of fellow F-22 test pilot, James Brown, who flew in formation with another Air Force Academy cadet in his back seat.

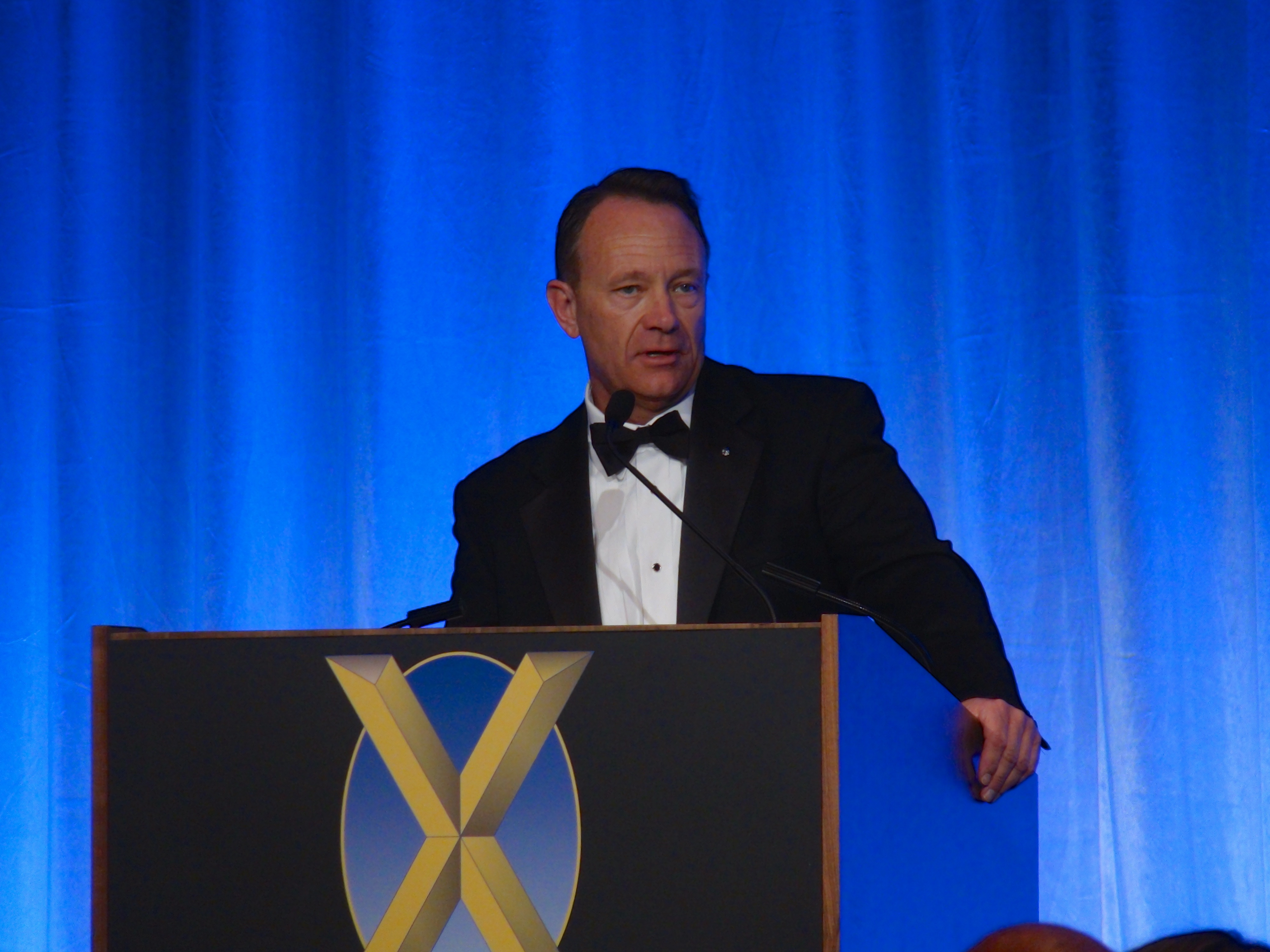
Rainey addresses SETP members at the Society's 2012 Awards Banquet

Rainey also encouraged civilian students to achieve academic excellence. In 2008, Rainey was the guest speaker at a dinner, sponsored by the Antelope Valley Athletic Club, that recognized outstanding students in local schools. Rainey has been a significant contributor to the Society of Experimental Test Pilots. He was the chairman of the West Coast section from 2005 through 2008 and was the society President for 2012.

In March 2012, Rainey met with Harald and Margi Bauer and gave them a tour of the Air Force Flight Test Center at Edwards AFB. As a teenager during World War II, Bauer tested the Heinkel He 162 for the German Luftwaffe. After the war, he graduated from the University of Kentucky, became a United States citizen, flew for U.S. Navy during the Korean War, and had a successful career as an Associated Press and United Press International journalist.

During 2012, Rainey continued to perform F-22 flight testing at Edwards AFB. On April 6, he was on hand to congratulate his friend, James Brown, who became the first test pilot to reach 1,000 flight hours in the F-22.

On May 4, 2012, Rainey piloted the first flight of the QF-16 Full-Scale Aerial Target (FSAT) at Cecil Field in Jacksonville, Florida. The QF-16 is a target drone variant of the F-16 that is planned to replace the aging QF-4. Rainey's 66-minute flight to validate flying qualities and drone operation is the first step of the QF-16 flight test program that will be performed at Tyndall Air Force Base, Holloman Air Force Base, and White Sands Missile Range.

Rainey flew the 1,000th sortie of the Raptor program on April 19, 2013, in aircraft 4007 while testing the Increment 3.2A avionics software upgrade. Aircraft 4007 is the oldest flying Raptor and is often referred to as the "James Bond jet" due to the similarity with the fictional British secret agent's code name - "007".

=== Lockheed Martin ===
In January 2014, Rainey joined Lockheed Martin as F-22 chief test pilot. He spent the next year testing improvements and new capabilities on the jet. On January 22, 2015, Rainey reached a milestone 1,000 hours flying the F-22 Raptor. As test director, Rainey has been overseeing F‑22 capability improvements including weapons, data links, and an automatic ground collision avoidance system.

Rainey has worked on the F-22 program nearly from its beginning. On May 17, 1998, he was the first Air Force pilot to fly the F-22. Exactly twenty years later on May 17, 2018, now as Lockheed's chief F-22 test pilot, Rainey again flew the fighter to exceed 1,260 flight hours in the Raptor. To celebrate this anniversary, Rainey received a "wash down" from the ground support team. Normally reserved for a pilot's final or "fini" flight, a wash down soaks the pilot with water or champagne as he or she exits the aircraft. The wash down has been a tradition for military aviators since World War II.

=== Stratolaunch Systems ===
In 2022, Rainey left Lockheed Martin and accepted a test pilot position with Stratolaunch Systems where he is helping to test the world's largest airplane, Scaled Composites Roc, that will eventually be used to launch aerospace payloads. On May 4, 2022, Rainey co-piloted Roc on the first test of a pylon to which hypersonic vehicles will be mounted. In 2023, he provided insights on the F-22 and the Roc at an event hosted by the Western Museum of Flight, and described challenges landing large aircraft.

Rainey and his wife, Cindy, live at the Rosamond Skypark where they fly their Van's Aircraft RV-4 and Cessna 180 Skywagon.

== Honors ==
Rainey is a fellow and past president of the Society of Experimental Test Pilots.
