= 411 Squadron =

411 squadron may refer to:

- No. 411 Squadron RCAF, Canada
- 411th Aero Squadron, a United States aero squadron
- 411th Bombardment Squadron, United States
- 411th Flight Test Squadron, United States
