= Onizuka Prop Wash Award =

- Awarded for: Contribution to class spirit
- Location: Edwards Air Force Base
- Country: United States
- Presented by: United States Air Force Test Pilot School Students
- First award: 1956

The Onizuka Prop Wash Award recognizes the student at the United States Air Force Test Pilot School (USAF TPS) who contributed most to class spirit and morale. The honoree from each class is selected by his or her fellow students rather than by school faculty. The award is named in memory of TPS graduate Ellison Onizuka who perished in the explosion of the Space Shuttle Challenger in 1986.

== History ==
The Prop Wash Award was introduced at the USAF Test Pilot school in 1956. The award takes the form of a wooden aircraft propeller to which plaques bearing the name of each honoree are mounted. Prop wash refers to the spiral-shaped slipstream formed behind a rotating propeller on an aircraft. The phrase, Illegitimi non carborundum, a mock-Latin aphorism meaning "Don't let the bastards grind you down" is engraved on the face.

The first recipient of the award was Major Joseph W. Rogers from class 56D who would later set a world speed record in the Convair F-106 Delta Dart. Captain Onizuka was also a recipient when he graduated from the Test Pilot School with class 74B. After Onizuka's death, the members of his class requested a rededication of the award. The inscription was changed in June 1988 for the graduation of TPS class 87B.

There is a lot of Ell here always… I thank you all for giving Ell a permanent place here, because (Edwards) is so important in our lives.

— Lorna Onizuka, 1990,

The USAF Test Pilot School participates in an exchange program with other test communities. U.S. Navy and U.S. Marine Corps students from the Naval Test Pilot School at the Patuxent River Naval Air Station, Maryland attend the USAF TPS and vice versa. Foreign students may also attend and include those from the Empire Test Pilots' School at Boscombe Down, England, and the EPNER (École du Personnel Navigant d'Essais et de Réception), the French Test Pilots' School. All students at the USAF TPS are eligible to receive the Prop Wash Award.

== Recipients ==
The following table contains an incomplete list of Onizuka Prop Wash award recipients including name, country (if not the United States of America), military branch (if not the United States Air Force), military rank at the time of the award, and USAF Test Pilot School class number.

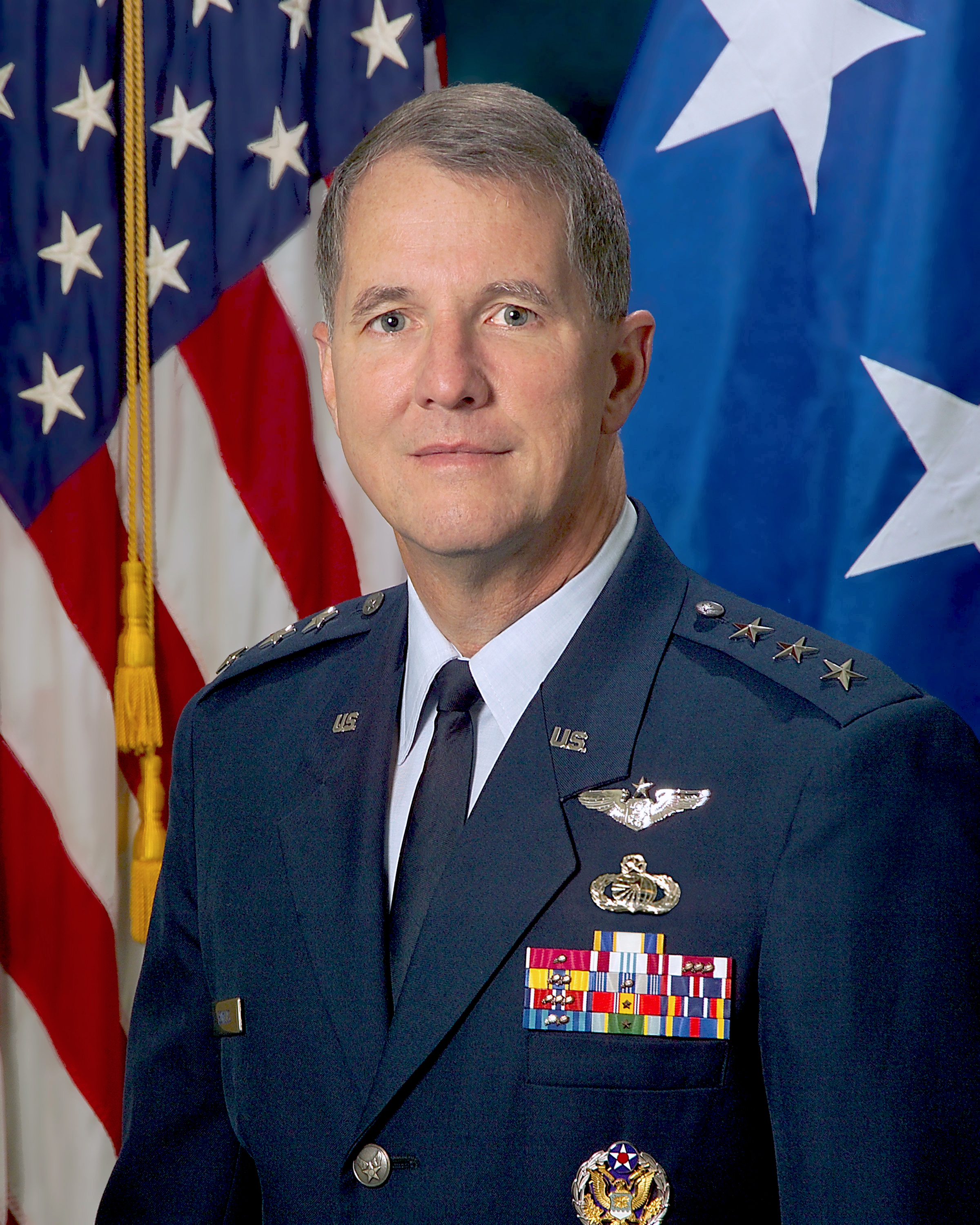
Ted F. Bowlds, Class 80A

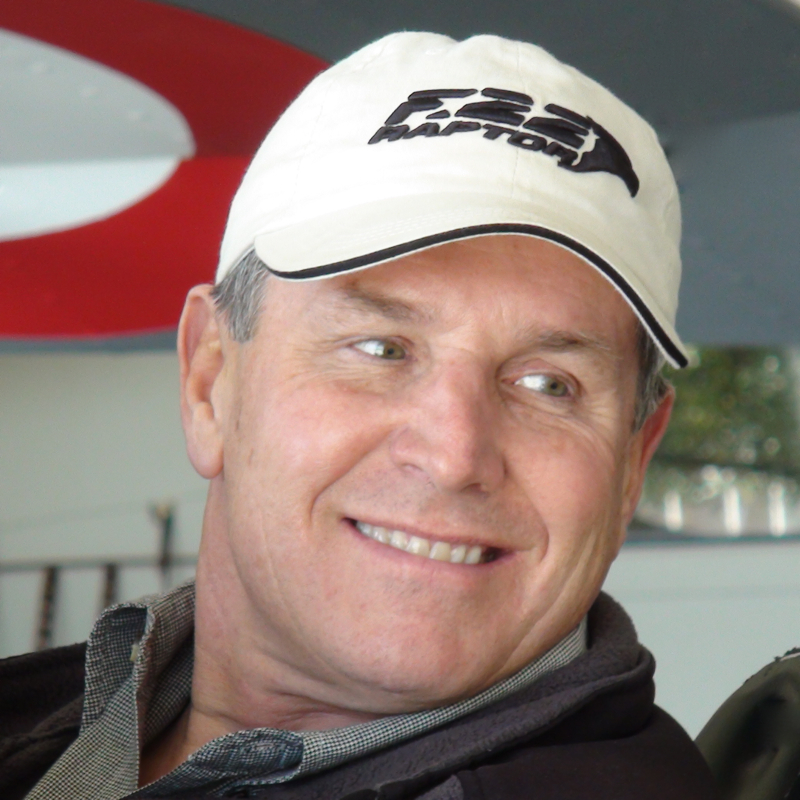
James E. Brown III, Class 86A

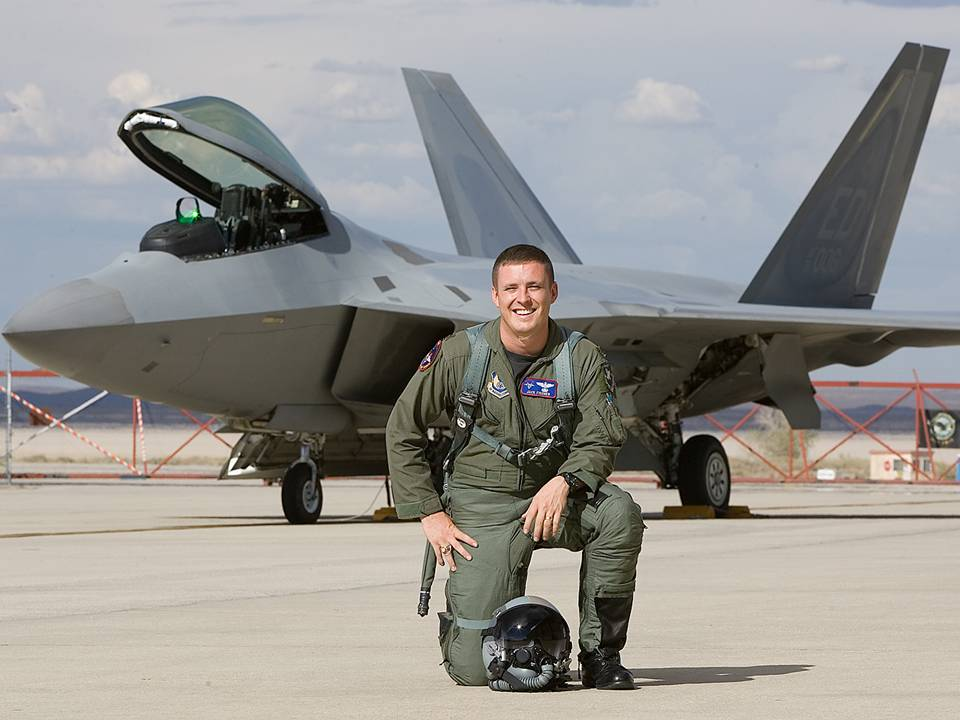
Jack D. Fischer, Class 03B

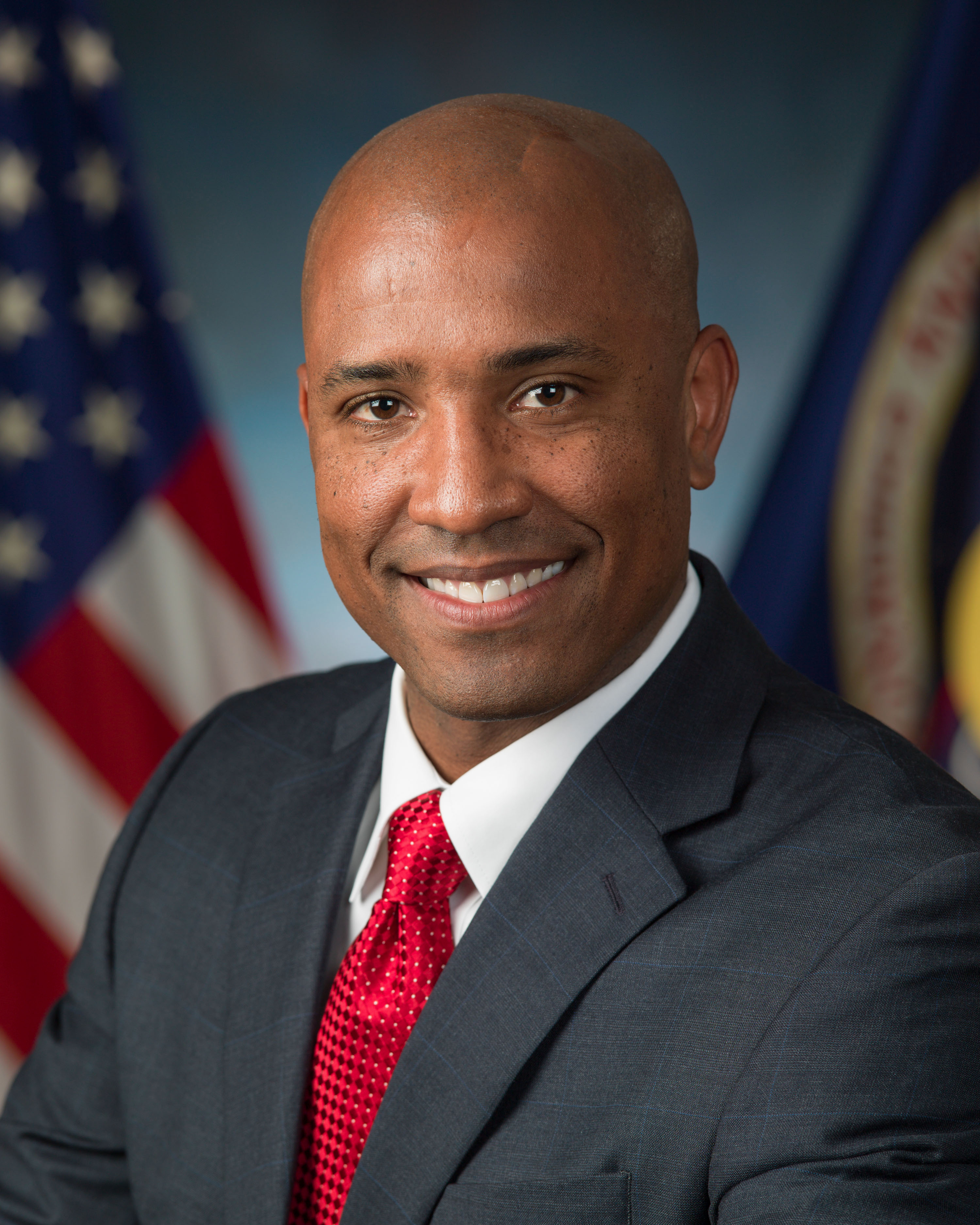
Victor Glover, Class 06B

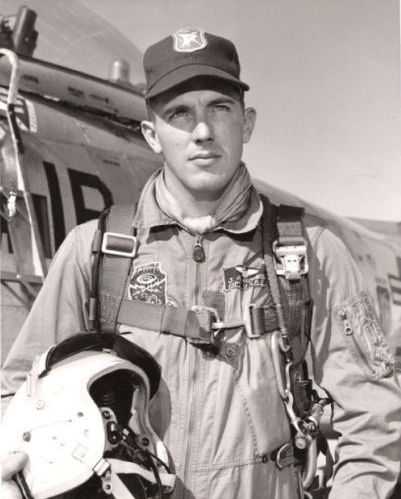
Joe Guthrie, Class 58C

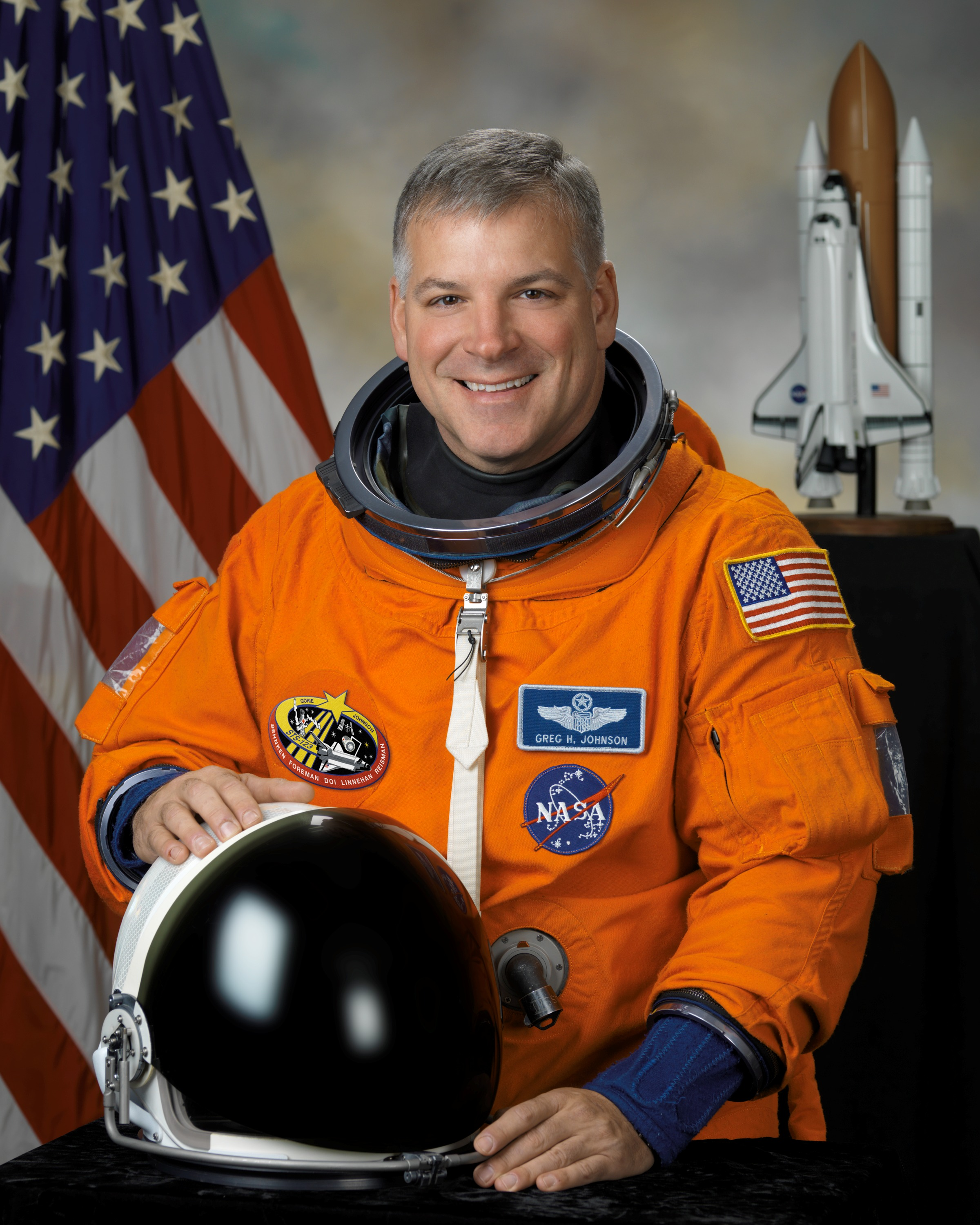
Gregory H. Johnson, Class 94A

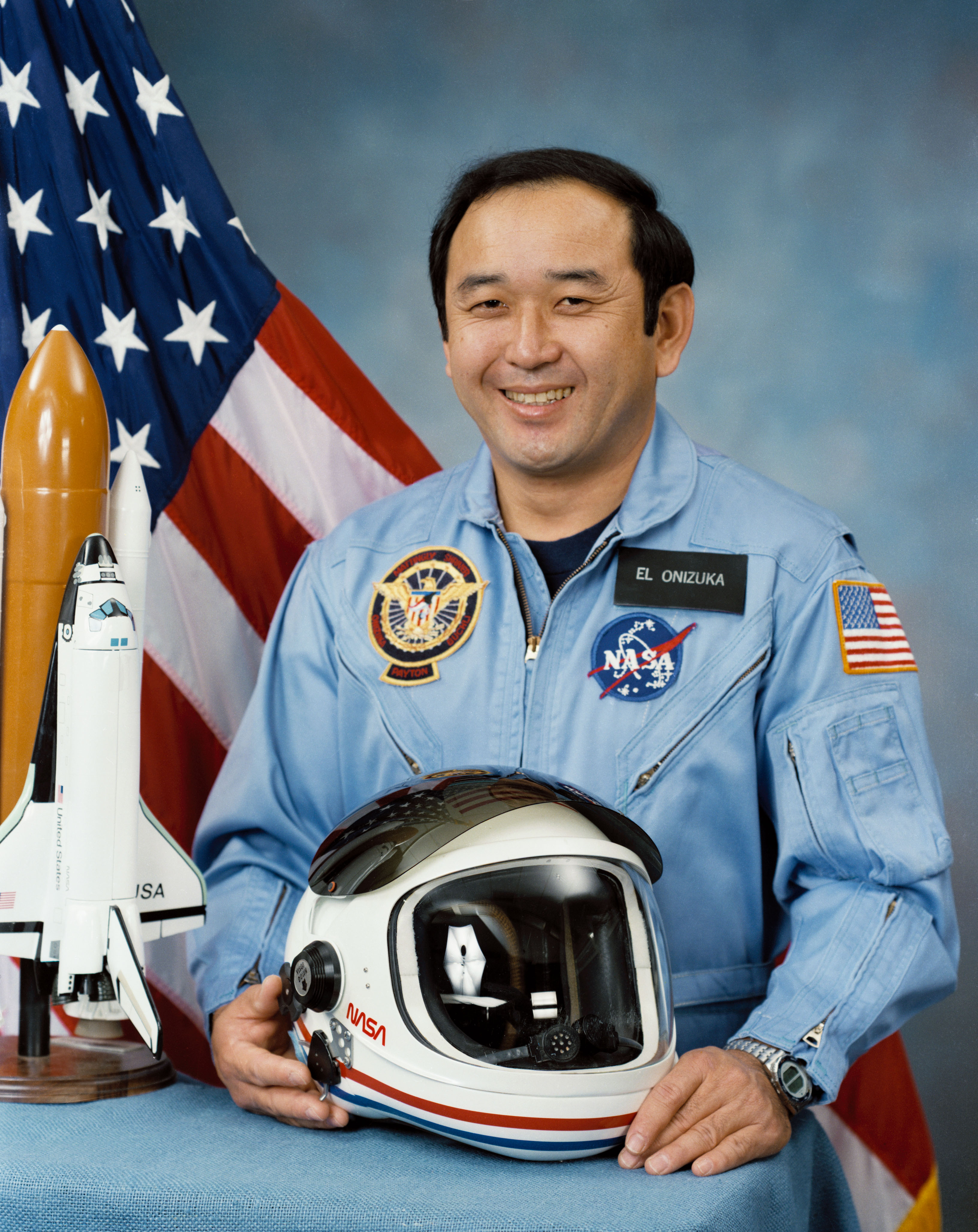
Ellison Onizuka, Class 74B

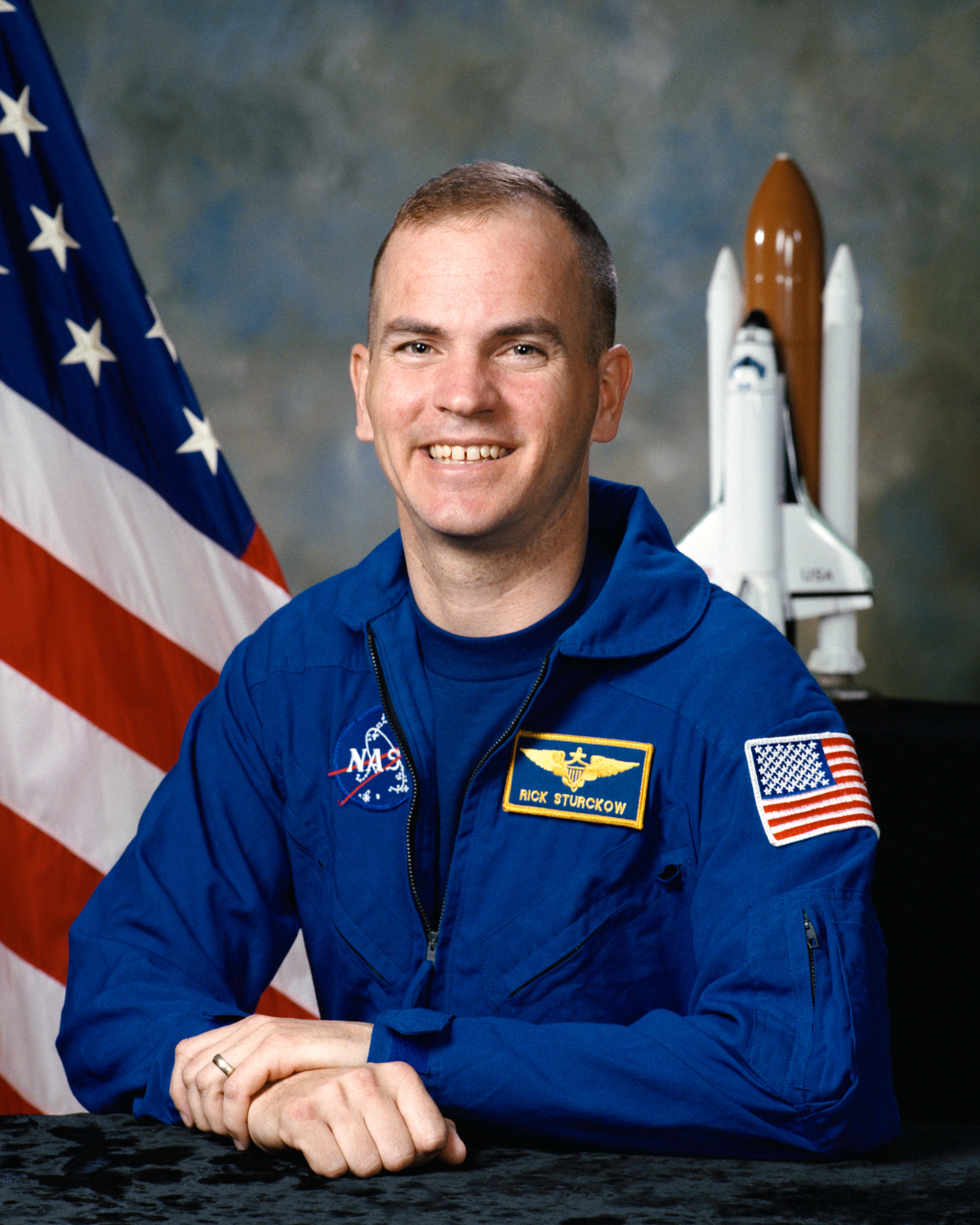
Rick Sturckow, Class 92A

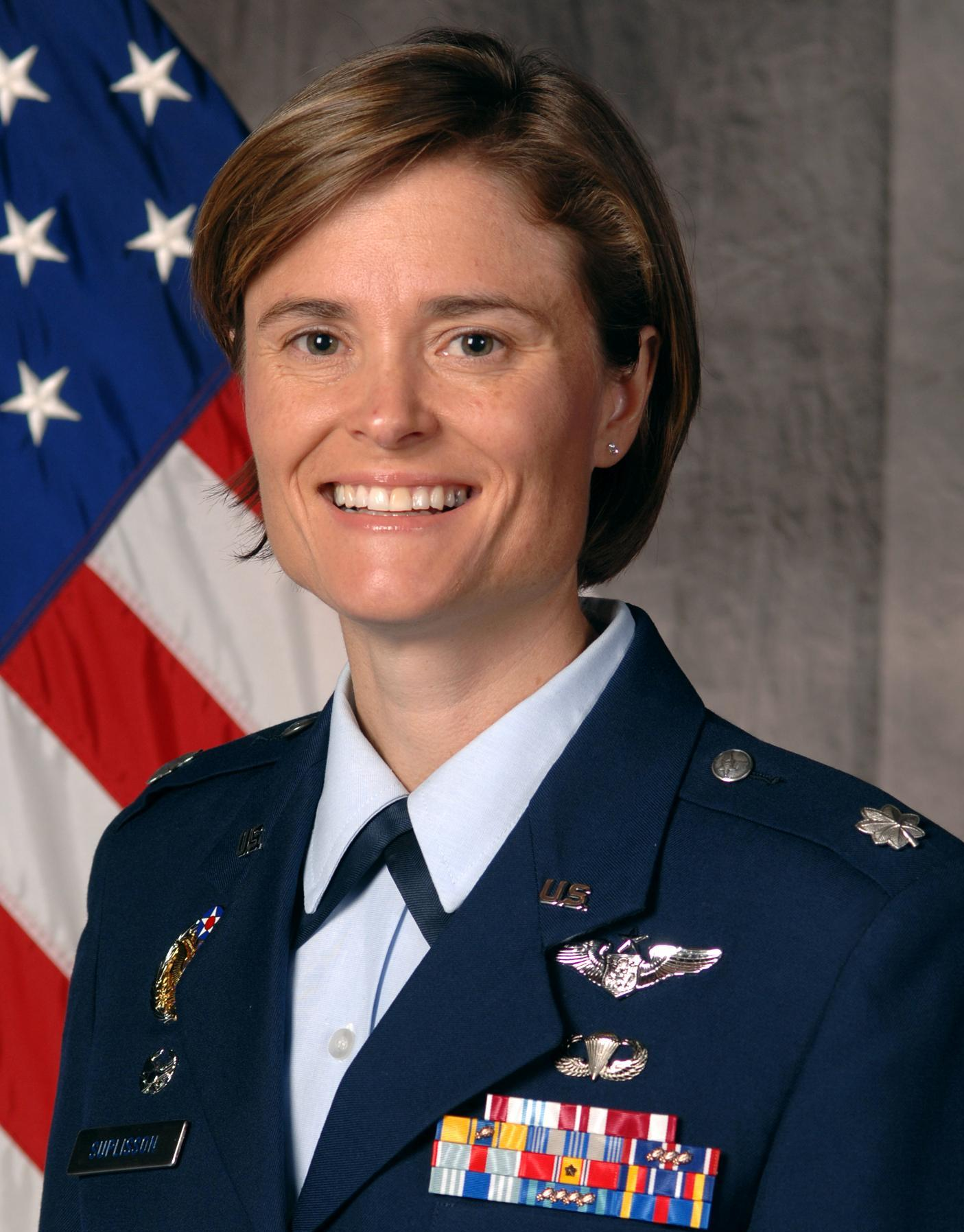
Angela Wallace Suplisson, Class 95A

* Individual was killed in a work-related (aviation) accident.
** Multiple individuals shared the award.

Name	Rank	Class	Ref
Joseph W. Rogers	Major	56D	
Orgle D. Godwin	Captain	57A	
John L. Whitehead	Captain	57C	
Philip R. O'Brien, Jr.	Captain	57D	
Ralph C. Rich	First lieutenant	58A	
Shelton J. Anthony, Jr.	Captain	58B	
Joseph A. Guthrie, Jr.	Captain	58C	
Loren R. Brooks, Jr.*	Captain	59A	
Donald R. Maslen	Captain	59B	
Donald E. Westbrook	Captain	59C	
John H. Reddoch	Captain	60A	
Joseph C. Watts (USA)	Chief warrant officer	60B	
Harley A. Johnson*	Captain	60C	
George D. Knutkowski	Captain	61A	
Charles S. Aldrich	Captain	61C	
Jimmie R. Hall	Captain	62A	
Robert L. Jondahl	Captain	62C	
Wayne H. Jones	Captain	70B	
Michael J. Butchko, Jr.	Captain	71A	
David L. Ferguson	Major	71B	
Barton B. Switzer	Captain	72A	
Addison S. Thompson III	Major	72B	
William B. Hayden (USN)	Lieutenant commander	73A	
Edwin C. Newman	Major	74A	
Ellison C. Onizuka*	Captain	74B	
Richard S. Couch	Captain	75A	
Ralph J. Luczak	Captain	75B	
Frank T. Birk	Captain	76A	
Elton T. Pollock	Captain	76B	
Kenneth P. Sasine	Captain	77A	
Gerald L. Rifenburg	Captain	77B	
Richard T. Banholzer	Captain	78A	
Donald A. Cornell	Captain	78B	
John M. DeZonia	Captain	79A	
Richard V. Reynolds	Captain	79B	
Ted F. Bowlds	Captain	80A	
Douglas I. Tudor (Canada)	Captain	80B	
Ronald W. Shoulars	Major	81A	
Joe M. Roberts	Captain	81B	
Steve M. Watson	Captain	82A	
Kevin M. McNellis	Captain	82B	
Philip L. Soucy	Captain	83A	
Larry H. Cooper	Major	83B	
Douglas V. Palmer	Captain	84A	
Douglas M. Moss	Captain	84B	
John D. Rickerson	Captain	85A	
Lance C. Grace	Captain	85B	
James E. Brown III	Captain	86A	
Timothy B. Moore	Captain	86B	
James A. Jimenez	Captain	87A	
Stephen M. Ranson (Australia)	Flight lieutenant	87B	
Charles R. Louie, Jr.	Major	88A	
Michael R. Green	Captain	88B	
Mark P. Stucky (USMC)	Captain	89A	
Harrison H. Whiting	Captain	89B	
Michael A. Hoobler	Captain	90A	
Paul G. Smith	Captain	90B	
Bruce R. Dewitt	Captain	91A	
Charles A. Sternberg (USN)	Lieutenant	91B	
Frederick W. Sturckow (USMC)	Captain	92A	
Stuart M. Rodgers	Captain	92B	
John Kruzinauskas, Jr.	Captain	93A	
David W. Allvin	Captain	93B	
Gregory H. Johnson	Captain	94A	
Edwin V. Odisho II (USMC)	Captain	94B	
Angela L. Wallace	Captain	95A	
Joseph C. Sussingham	Major	95B	
Patrick M. Tom	Captain	96A	
Thomas G. Coleman	Captain	96B	
Donald J. Kaderbek, Jr.	Captain	97A	
Rick A. Palo	Captain	97B	
Jeffrey Woods	Captain	98A	
Om Prakash	Captain	98B	
Charles S. Greenwald	Major	99A	
Latheef N. Ahmed	Captain	99B	
Carl E. Schaefer	Captain	00A	
Jack D. Fischer	Captain	03B	
Victor Glover (USN)	Lieutenant	06B	
David Kern	Major	08A	
Christopher Buckley	Captain	08B	
Mark Graziano*	Major	09A	
Jimmy Jones	Major	09B	
Timothy Spaulding	Captain	10A	
Edward Steinfort	Captain	10B	
Timothy Stevens**	Major	11A	
Christopher Rondeau**	Captain	11A	
Casey Richardson	Major	11B	
Jeremy Vanderhal	Captain	12A	
Juan Jurado	Captain	12B	
Brian Sinclair (USN)	Commander	13A	
Christopher Nations	Captain	13B	
Paul Fulkerson	Captain	14B	
Ryall Meyer**	Major	16B	
Chris Thorn**	Captain	16B	
Charles Brantigan	Major	17B	
Francesco Guiseppe Panebianco	Air Marshal	18B	
Cameron Horn	Major	19A	

== See also ==
- List of aviation awards
