= James E. Brown (disambiguation) =

James Elisha Brown (1913–1974) was a member of the Canadian House of Commons.

James E. Brown may also refer to:

- James E. Brown III (born 1954), United States Air Force officer and test pilot
- Jim Ed Brown (1934–2015), American country music singer
- James Hall (actor) (born James E. Brown, 1900–1940), American film actor
