= David P. Cooley =

American test pilot (1960–2009)

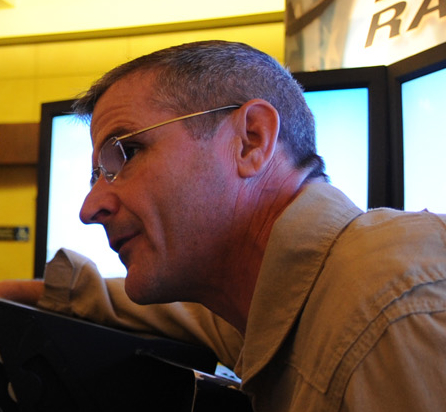
- Dave Cooley explains how the F-22 Raptor simulator operates. (USAF Photo)
- Born: February 15, 1960; RAF Mildenhall, England, United Kingdom
- Died: March 25, 2009 (aged 49); Harper Dry Lake; 35 miles NE of Edwards Air Force Base
- Military career
- Allegiance: United States of America
- Branch: United States Air Force
- Service years: 1982 – 2003 (21 years)
- Rank: Lieutenant colonel
- Nickname: Cools
- Commands: Vice Commandant, USAF TPS; F-117 chief test pilot

David Paul Cooley (February 15, 1960 – March 25, 2009) was a Lockheed test pilot and retired United States Air Force (USAF) officer, responsible for developmental flight testing of the F-117 Nighthawk. He was killed while flying a test mission in an F-22 Raptor jet fighter over the high desert of Southern California.

== Biography ==
=== Early years ===
The son of a USAF airman, David Cooley was born February 15, 1960, at RAF Mildenhall in Suffolk, England. He grew up in Fairview Heights, Illinois, and graduated from Belleville East High School. Cooley was an exceptional soccer player and captain of his high school team. His enjoyment of soccer continued throughout his life, and he was a dedicated bicyclist. He attended the United States Air Force Academy in Colorado Springs, Colorado, and graduated in 1982 with a degree in aeronautical engineering. George H. W. Bush, then Vice President of the United States, was the graduation speaker and presented Cooley with his diploma, a moment of special pride for the young officer. While at the academy, he met his future wife, Sheyla, who was also a cadet.

=== Career ===
After completing flight training, Cooley was assigned to fly the F-111 Aardvark and later became an instructor in that aircraft. He began his career in flight test in 1989 conducting operational testing of new weapons and systems for the F-111. Cooley was selected to attend the Empire Test Pilots' School in Wiltshire, England as the Air Force exchange officer. He graduated in 1992 and returned to the United States assigned to the 445th Flight Test Squadron where he conducted tests on avionics and missile evaluation for the F-15 Eagle. Cooley was also the chief pilot for the United States Coast Guard RU-38 Twin Condor aircraft flight test program.

In 1998, he was selected as the operations officer for the 410th Flight Test Squadron and performed developmental flight testing of the F-117 Nighthawk. From 2000 to 2003, he served as the vice commandant for the U.S. Air Force Test Pilot School. He was responsible for the day-to-day operations of all aspects of the school and also mentored students as a full-time flight instructor. After retiring from the Air Force in 2003, he was hired by Lockheed Martin as the F-117 chief test pilot. In September 2007, he transitioned to the F-22 Combined Test Force (CTF) at Edwards Air Force Base. During this time, Cooley and his family lived in Lancaster, California.

=== Accident ===
At approximately 10 a.m. on the morning of March 25, 2009, an F-22A piloted by Cooley crashed at Harper Dry Lake, near Lockhart, California about 35 miles northeast of Edwards Air Force Base. Paramedics transported Cooley from the crash scene to Victor Valley Community Hospital in Victorville, California, where he was pronounced dead. The wreckage of Cooley's F-22A crash extended ten miles east from the site of the accident in Hoffman Road from the Fremont Peak Road, in San Bernardino County and the debris field covered a wide area including three washes. A security team was deployed to cordon off the area due to aircraft materials that may pose health risks.

The Air Force convened an investigation board to determine the cause of the accident. On July 31, 2009, the Air Force released the board's accident report that identified human factors associated with high gravitational forces as the cause of the crash. Due to the high g-forces required by the flight profile, Cooley was likely incapacitated by "almost g-induced loss of consciousness" (G-LOC).

== Reaction and legacy ==
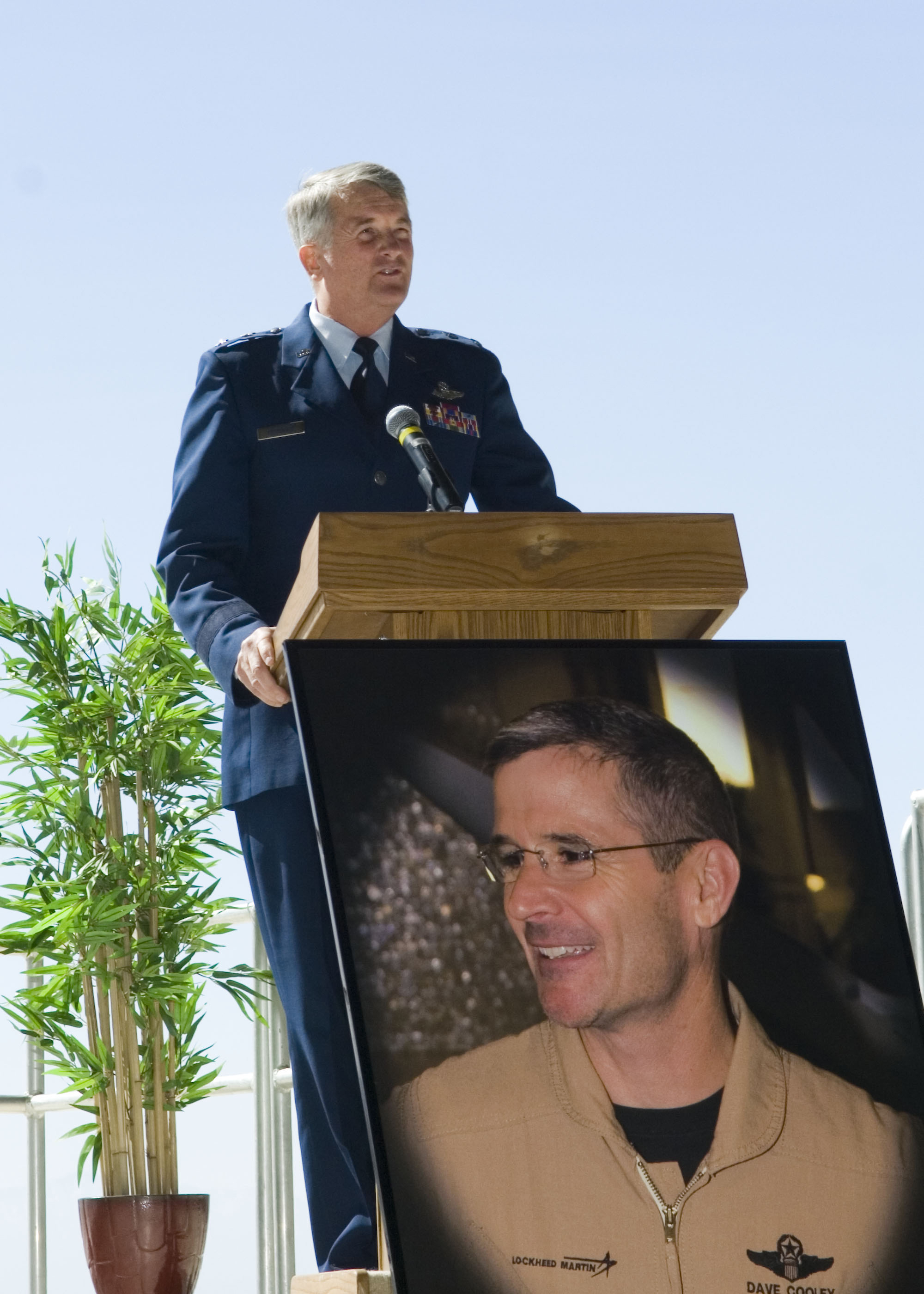
MGen David Eichhorn bids farewell to Dave Cooley, Edwards AFB, April 2009. (USAF Photo)

Lockheed Martin Chairman, President and CEO Bob Stevens recognized Cooley's contributions in an all-employee memo the day after the crash.

Our thoughts and prayers are with David's family and friends during this difficult time. We will remember David with great admiration for his courage, his dedication, and his many contributions to our company and our nation.

A funeral service held on March 30, 2009, at Palmdale United Methodist church was attended by hundreds of colleagues, family members and friends. Two days later, the USAF held a memorial in Hangar 1600 at Edwards Air Force Base. Speakers included 411th Flight Test Squadron commander Lt. Col. Dan Daetz, Lockheed Martin representative James Brown, and Air Force Flight Test Center commander Major General David Eichhorn.

We are here to honor a life, a life well lived. A week ago, the morning of March 25, a calm day with clear skies, it was a perfect day for a test pilot to take man and machine to their limits. The flight briefing was professional. The test pilot, Dave Cooley, was well prepared and well rehearsed. Nothing was out of the ordinary, until tragically and suddenly, the plane went down. But we all know that it is tragedy that brings out the best in people. While everyone dies, not everyone really lives. David Cooley really lived. Husband, father, Air Force officer, test pilot, he was all of these and more.

— MGen David Eichhorn

In addition to his wife, Cooley is survived by their three sons, Paul, Mark and Aaron; his father and stepmother, William and Peggy Cooley; one brother, Bill Cooley; and two sisters, Susan Pfalzer and Cathy Baker.

The Antelope Valley College Foundation sponsors a scholarship in Cooley's name to enable the recipient to pursue a four-year degree and subsequent career in engineering, math, science and/or aeronautical technology.
