= Ted F. Bowlds =

US Air Force general

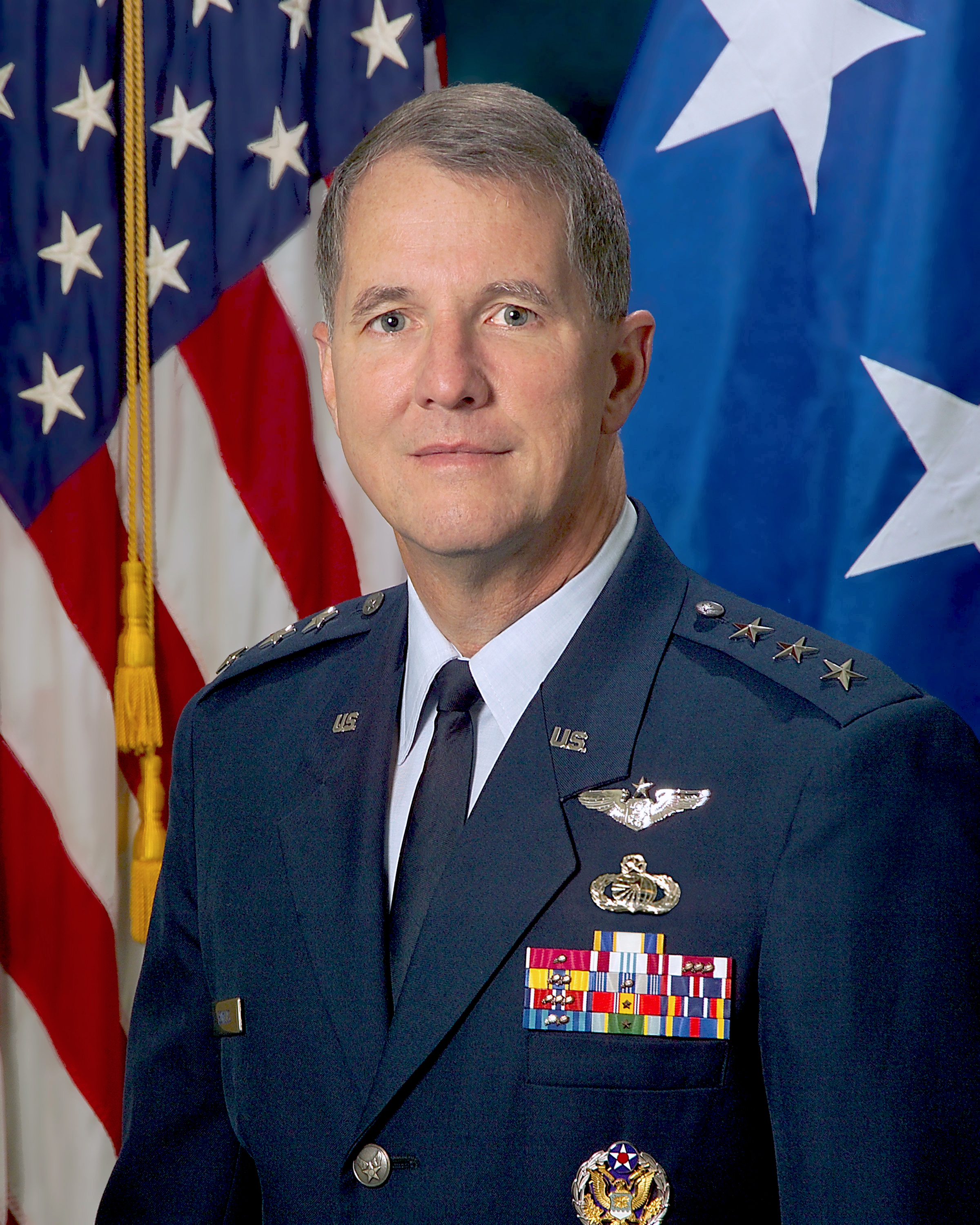
- Ted F. Bowlds
- Born: September 11, 1953 (age 73); Fulton, New York, U.S.
- Military career
- Allegiance: United States of America
- Branch: United States Air Force
- Service years: 1975–2011
- Rank: Lieutenant general
- Commands: Electronic Systems Center
- Awards: Air Force Distinguished Service Medal; Legion of Merit

Lieutenant General Ted Francis Bowlds (born September 11, 1953) is a former Commander, Electronic Systems Center, Hanscom Air Force Base, Mass. He commanded the center from November 7, 2007, until his retirement on September 1, 2011. The center's mission is to acquire command and control systems for the Air Force. The organization comprises more than 12,000 people located at six sites throughout the United States. The men and women of the ESC manage more than $3 billion in programs annually in support of the Air Force, and joint and coalition forces.

General Bowlds entered the Air Force in 1975 through the AFROTC program. In earlier assignments, he served as an engineer in an Air Force laboratory and as a flight test engineer on the F-117. He has worked as avionics program manager on the B-2, bomber branch chief at the Pentagon, chief of advance medium range air-to-air missile development in the AMRAAM System Program Office, and as commander of the Rome Laboratory in Rome, New York.

General Bowlds also served as the deputy director of global power programs with the Office of the Assistant Secretary of the Air Force for Acquisition, Headquarters U.S. Air Force, Washington, D.C. Prior to assuming his current position, he was assigned as commander, Air Force Research Laboratory, Wright-Patterson AFB, Ohio. He was responsible for managing the Air Force's $2 billion science and technology program as well as additional customer-funded research and development of $1.7 billion.

== Life ==
General Bowlds was a member of the Civil Air Patrol and earned the Spaatz award. He is now the vice president of the Spaatz Association.

General Bowlds is a 1973 graduate of Mississippi State University, with a degree in electrical engineering. He was a member of Triangle Fraternity at Mississippi State, and continues to serve his fraternity as a member of the board of directors of the Triangle Education Foundation.

The General currently is CEO of Innovative Perspectives, LLC, a consulting firm that advises companies on strategic planning and contract proposals.

== Education ==
- 1975 Bachelor of Science degree in electrical engineering, Mississippi State University
- 1979 Master of Science degree in electrical engineering, Air Force Institute of Technology, Wright-Patterson AFB, Ohio
- 1980 Flight Test Engineers Course, U.S. Air Force Test Pilot School, Edwards AFB, California
- 1983 Squadron Officer School, Maxwell AFB, Alabama
- 1985 Air Command and Staff College, by correspondence
- 1985 Defense Systems Management College, Fort Belvoir, Virginia
- 1992 Master of Science degree in engineering management, University of Dayton, Ohio
- 1993 Air War College, by correspondence
- 1994 Air War College, Maxwell AFB, Alabama
- 2000 Advanced Management Program, the University of Michigan's Ross School of Business
- 2002 National Security Management Course, Syracuse University, Syracuse, New York

== Assignments ==
- May 1975 – June 1978, computer systems analyst, Aeronautical Systems Division, Wright-Patterson AFB, Ohio
- July 1978 – December 1979, project engineer and global positioning system evaluator, Air Force Avionics Laboratory, Aeronautical Systems Division, Wright-Patterson AFB, Ohio
- January 1980 – December 1980, student, U.S. Air Force Test Pilot School, Edwards AFB, California
- January 1981 – December 1984, F-117 test program manager, Air Force Flight Test Center, Detachment 3, Air Force Systems Command, Edwards AFB, California
- January 1985 – June 1985, student, Defense Systems Management College, Fort Belvoir, Virginia
- July 1985 – June 1989, chief, B-2 Avionics Branch, B-2 System Program Office, Aeronautical Systems Division, Wright-Patterson AFB, Ohio
- July 1989 – June 1993, chief of Bomber Branch, Directorate of Long-Range Power Projection, Special Operations Forces, Airlift and Training Programs, Office of the Secretary of the Air Force for Acquisition, Washington, D.C.
- July 1993 – June 1994, student, Air War College, Maxwell AFB, Alabama
- July 1994 – August 1995, chief of Advance Medium Range Air-to-Air Missile Development Integrated Process Team, AMRAAM System Program Office, Aeronautical Systems Center, Eglin AFB, Florida
- September 1995 – July 1997, commander of Air Force Rome Laboratory, Air Force Materiel Command, Rome, New York
- July 1997 – February 1999, deputy director of Global Power Programs, Office of the Secretary of the Air Force for Acquisition, Washington, D.C.
- March 1999 – September 2001, program director of C-17 System Program Office, Aeronautical Systems Center, Wright-Patterson AFB, Ohio
- September 2001 – January 2004, program executive officer for airlift and trainers, Headquarters U.S. Air Force, Washington, D.C.
- February 2004 – January 2006, deputy for acquisition, Aeronautical Systems Center, Wright-Patterson AFB, Ohio
- January 2006 – November 2007, commander of Air Force Research Laboratory, Wright-Patterson AFB, Ohio
- November 2007 – 1 September 2011, commander of Electronic Systems Center, Hanscom AFB, Mass.

== Major awards and decorations ==
- Air Force Distinguished Service Medal
- Legion of Merit with oak leaf cluster
- Defense Meritorious Service Medal
- Meritorious Service Medal with three oak leaf clusters
- Air Force Commendation Medal with two oak leaf clusters
- Air Force Achievement Medal with oak leaf cluster

== Effective dates of promotion ==
- Second Lieutenant June 4, 1975
- First Lieutenant July 31, 1977
- Captain July 31, 1979
- Major December 1, 1986
- Lieutenant Colonel April 1, 1990
- Colonel July 1, 1996
- Brigadier General July 1, 2002
- Major General November 1, 2005
- Lieutenant General November 7, 2007
