= 411th Flight Test Squadron =

United States Air Force military unit

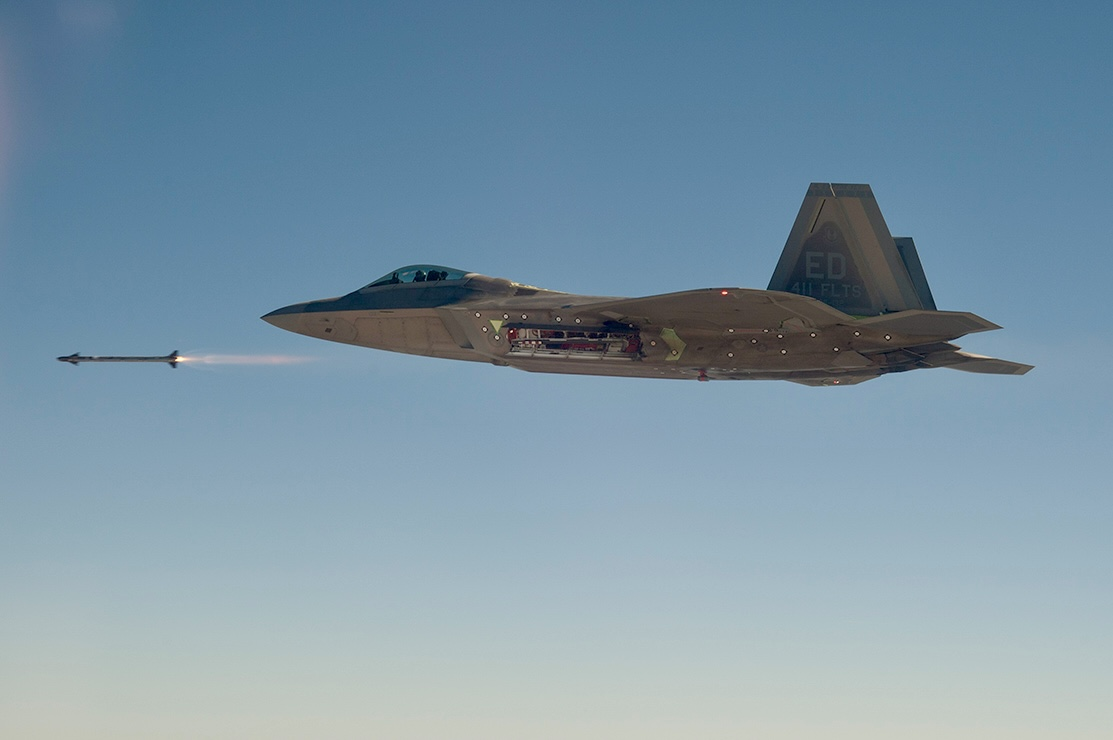
- 411th Flight Test Squadron F-22A Raptor (Note: Aircraft is the squadron flagship, Lockheed Martin F-22A Block 30 Raptor, serial 06-4132.)
- Active: 1989–present
- Country: United States
- Branch: United States Air Force
- Type: Squadron
- Role: Flight Testing
- Part of: Air Force Materiel Command
- Garrison/HQ: Edwards Air Force Base, California
- Tail Code: "ED"
- Decorations: Air Force Outstanding Unit Award

Commanders
- Notable commanders: Steven M. Rainey

Insignia
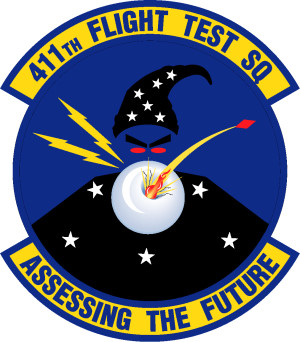
- 411th Flight Test Squadron emblem (approved 2 March 1990)

Aircraft flown
- Fighter: Lockheed Martin F-22; Lockheed YF-22; Northrop YF-23

The 411th Flight Test Squadron is a United States Air Force squadron assigned to the 412th Operations Group of Air Force Materiel Command, stationed at Edwards Air Force Base, California. It conducted the Advanced Tactical Fighter program flyoff competition between the Lockheed YF-22 and Northrop YF-23 prototypes. Following the completion of the competition, the squadron has conducted testing of the Lockheed Martin F-22 as part of the F-22 Combined Test Force (CTF).

== History ==
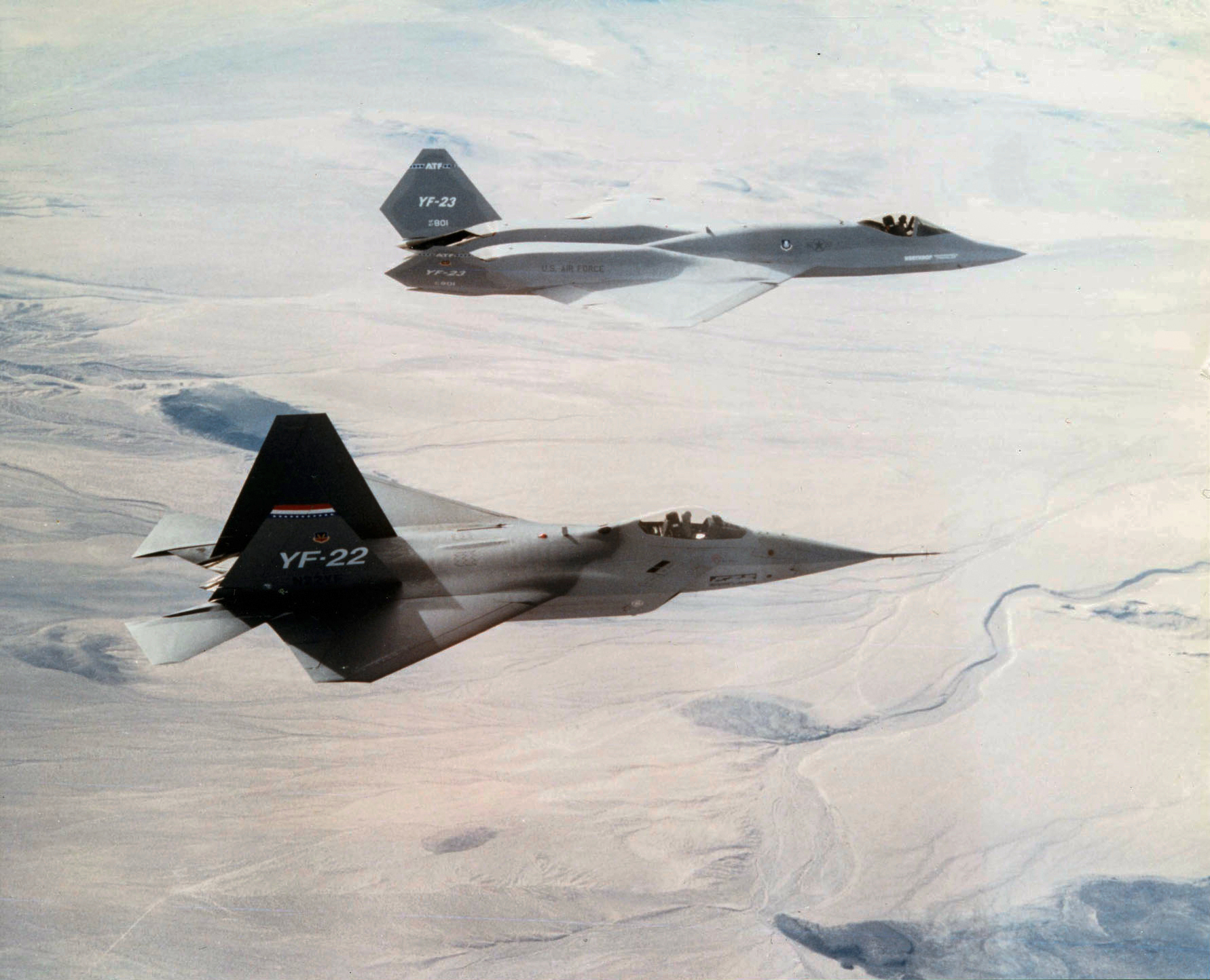
The YF-22 and YF-23 in formation during flight testing in the early 1990s

The squadron was first activated as the 6511th Test Squadron in March 1989 to conduct the Advanced Tactical Fighter program. It began flying the Northrop YF-23 on 27 August and the Lockheed YF-22 on 29 September 1990, flying both through December 1990, though the airplanes were assigned to the manufacturers rather than to USAF. The F-22 (and the Pratt & Whitney F119 engine) was declared the winner of the ATF competition on 23 April 1991, and on 2 August 1991 both YF-22 prototypes were transferred to the Air Force.

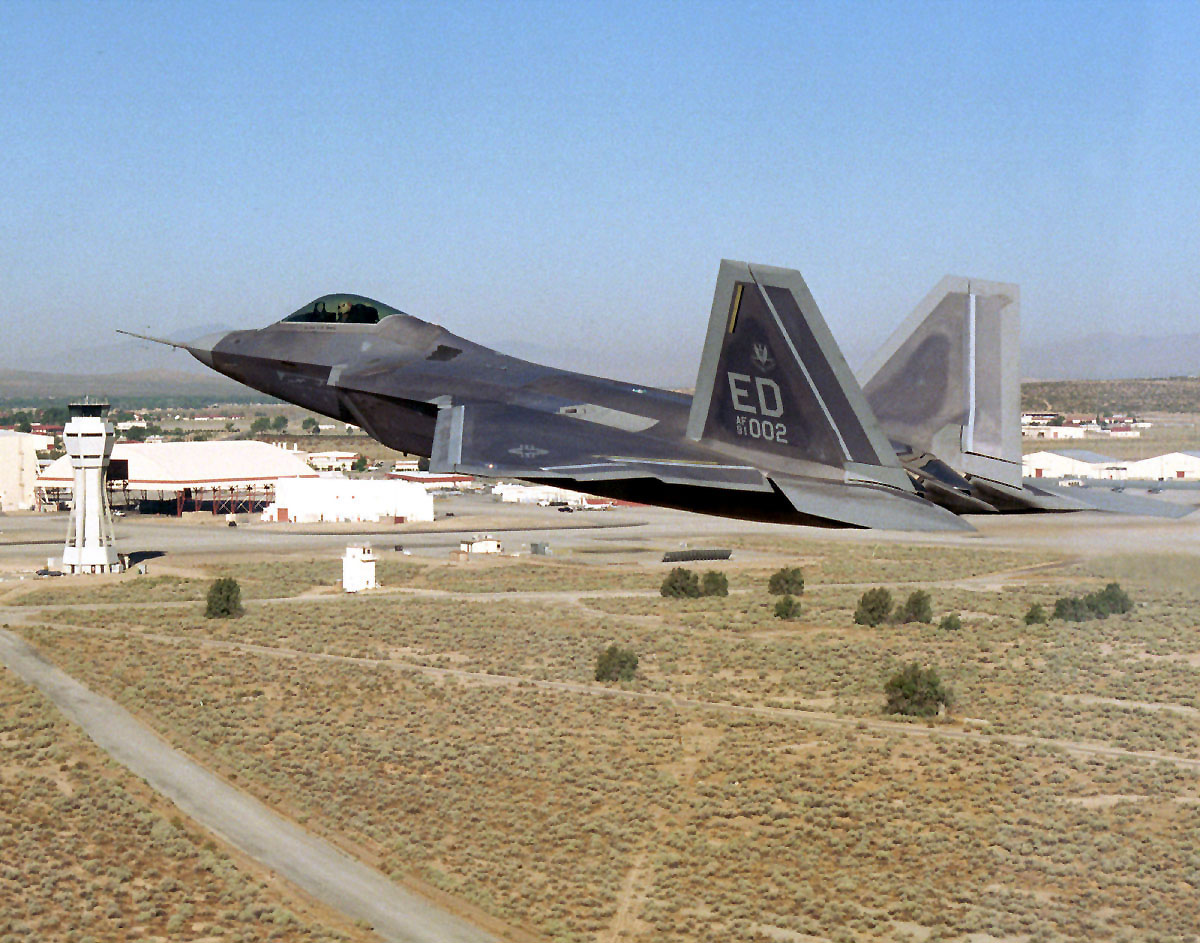
The second F-22, tail number 91-4002, assigned to the 411th FLTS

Though the Number 1 YF-22 returned to the Lockheed Corporation plant to become a ground test bed for production designs, the Number 2 aircraft flew with the 6511th until 25 April 1992, when it was extensively damaged in a landing mishap. The 6511th (redesignated the 411th Test Squadron in October 1992) then spent the next few years planning for the F-22 test program and received the first Lockheed Martin F-22A Raptor in February 1998. Edwards flight testing was completed in December 2004 and the 27th Fighter Squadron at Langley Air Force Base, Virginia was the first squadron to transition to the Raptor, receiving the first operational aircraft 18 January 2005 from Tyndall Air Force Base, Florida, where the 43d Fighter Squadron trained Raptor pilots.

On 25 March 2009 an F-22 operated by a squadron pilot, David P. Cooley, crashed 35 miles northeast of Edwards during a training flight. The cause of the accident was due to high-g maneuvers causing the pilot to g-LOC.

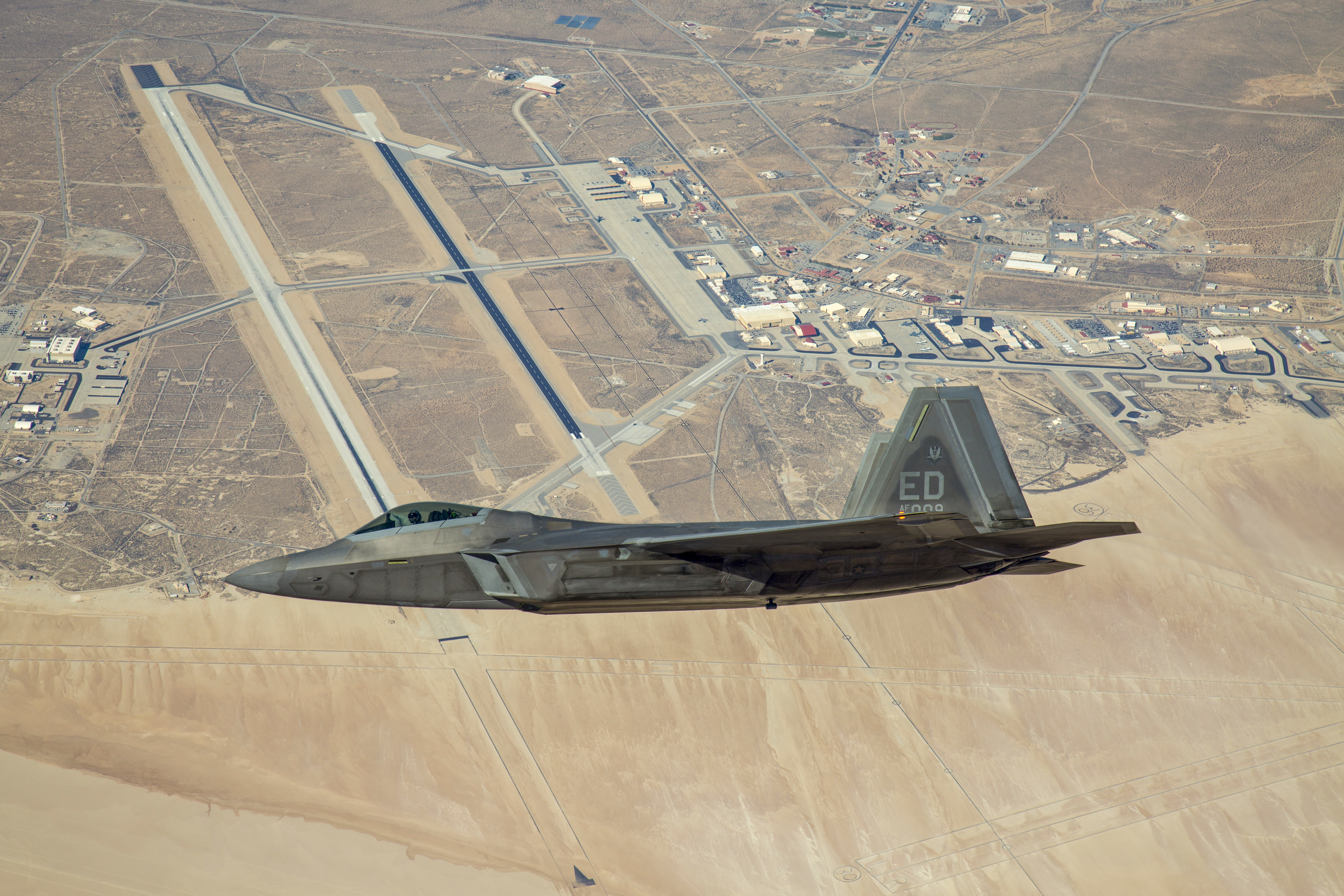
An F-22 Raptor assigned to the 411th Flight Test Squadron flies over Edwards Air Force Base, California, in 2018.

The squadron successfully tested the F-22 flying on a 50/50 fuel blend of conventional petroleum-based JP-8 and biofuel derived from camelina, a weed-like plant not used for food, in March 2011. The overall test objective was to evaluate biofuel fuel blend suitability in the F-22. Testing consisted of air starts, operability, and performance at different speeds and altitudes throughout the flight envelope. The F-22 Raptor performed several maneuvers including a supercruise (Note: Supercruise is supersonic flight without using the engine's afterburner.) at 40,000 ft. reaching speeds of Mach 1.5.

== Lineage ==
- Designated as the 6511th Test Squadron and activated on 10 March 1989

Redesignated 411th Test Squadron on 2 October 1992
Redesignated 411th Flight Test Squadron on 1 March 1994

=== Assignments ===
- 6510th Test Wing (later 412th Test Wing), 10 March 1989
- 412th Operations Group, 1 October 1993 – present

=== Stations ===
- Edwards Air Force Base, California, 10 March 1989 – present

=== Aircraft ===
- Lockheed YF-22, 1989–1991
- Lockheed Martin F-22A Raptor, 1998–present
- Northrop YF-23 Black Widow II, 1989–1991

=== Awards and campaigns ===
Award streamer	Award	Dates	Notes
	Air Force Outstanding Unit Award	1 January 1996-31 December 1996	411th Flight Test Squadron
	Air Force Outstanding Unit Award	1 January 1997-31 December 1998	411th Flight Test Squadron
	Air Force Outstanding Unit Award	1 January 2010–31 December 2011	411th Flight Test Squadron

== See also ==
- List of United States Air Force test squadrons
