= James E. Brown III =

American test pilot

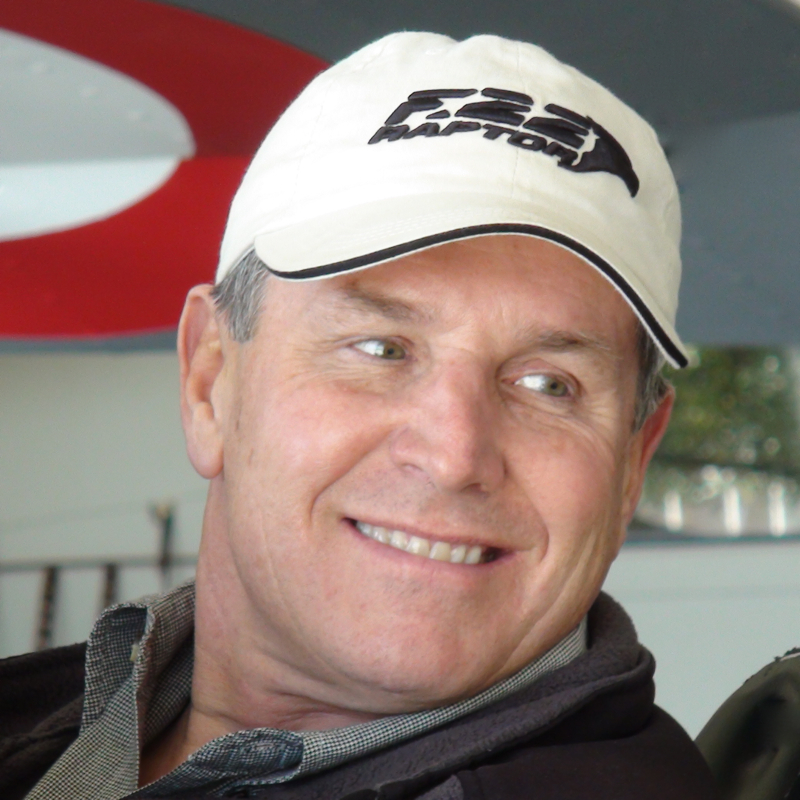
- JB Brown in 2010
- Born: August 15, 1954 (age 72); Bluefield, West Virginia, U.S.
- Military career
- Allegiance: United States of America
- Branch: United States Air Force
- Service years: 1976–1992 (16 years)
- Rank: Major
- Nickname: "JB"
- Units: 411th Flight Test Squadron; 527th Aggressor Squadron; 52d Fighter Wing
- Conflicts: Cold War
- Other work: Aerospace Industry

James E. Brown III (born August 15, 1954) is a former aerospace executive, test pilot instructor, and United States Air Force officer. At the end of 2024, Brown retired from the National Test Pilot School in Mojave, California where he served as president since 2022.

Previously, Brown was the vice president, chief operating officer, and test pilot instructor at the National Test Pilot School. Previously, he was the chief of flight operations for the Lockheed Martin Skunk Works in Palmdale, California. He also served as the chief test pilot for the F-22 Raptor program stationed at Edwards Air Force Base in California where he performed activities including avionics testing, flight envelope expansion, and the creation of procedural flight manuals for the Air Force. He was also the chief test pilot for the F-117 Nighthawk. Brown is a Fellow and past president of the Society of Experimental Test Pilots (SETP) and is a Fellow of the Royal Aeronautical Society.

== Early life ==
James Brown III was born in Bluefield, West Virginia, on August 15, 1954, and grew up in Birmingham, Alabama. His interest in flying developed with help from his father, who was an amateur pilot. The young man dreamed of one day becoming an astronaut. He attended the Virginia Military Institute (VMI) in Lexington, Virginia and graduated in 1976 with a Bachelor of Science degree in Civil Engineering. Brown's first solo flight occurred in February 1976.

== Military career ==
After graduating from VMI, Brown was commissioned as a Second Lieutenant in the United States Air Force. He entered the Undergraduate Pilot Training program in 1977 and earned his pilot wings the following year. Brown's first operational tour began in 1979 with the 480th Tactical Fighter Squadron of the 52d Fighter Wing at Spangdahlem Air Base in West Germany where he flew the F-4 Phantom II. On his next tour, Brown flew the F-5E Tiger II with the 527th Aggressor Squadron at Royal Air Force station Alconbury in England.

In 1985, he was selected to attend the U.S. Air Force Test Pilot School (TPS) at Edwards Air Force Base in California and graduated with Class 86A. His fellow students presented Brown with the Onizuka Prop Wash Award as the student who contributed most to class spirit and morale. The Prop Wash Award is dedicated to the memory of TPS graduate Colonel Ellison Onizuka who died as a member of the crew of the Space Shuttle Challenger in 1986. Following graduation, Brown tested the A-7 Corsair II, all models of the F-15 Eagle, and performed flight trials on a number of classified prototype aircraft. In 1992, after sixteen years of service, Brown separated from the Air Force.

== Civilian career ==
Brown interviewed with Lockheed for a test pilot position but, because of reduced military spending after the end of the Cold War, no openings were available. He joined United Airlines in 1992 and flew the Boeing 737 over North and Central America. Pursuing his boyhood dream, Brown applied to the NASA astronaut-training program but was rejected because of an abnormal electrocardiogram.

=== F-117 Nighthawk ===
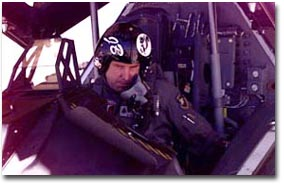
JB Brown prepares for an F-117 test mission

In 1994, he was hired by the Lockheed Skunk Works as a test pilot for the F-117 Nighthawk, where he helped develop and test improvements to the weapons system that proved valuable in Operation Allied Force and Operation Iraqi Freedom. One such improvement was the Integrated Real-time Information into the Cockpit/Real-time Information Out of the Cockpit for Combat Aircraft (IRRCA) project. In 1998 as IRRCA lead test pilot, Brown flew a simulated combat mission to demonstrate the ability to receive real-time mission updates from a satellite and automatically alter the F-117's planned route. The flight also demonstrated reception of text and imagery of the alternate target. Brown encouraged young engineers by presenting lectures such as Braking the F-117 Stealth Fighter given to the American Institute of Aeronautics and Astronautics student chapter at the University of California, San Diego. He continued his education and earned a Master of Science degree in Management from Troy State University in Alabama and completed graduate study in mechanical engineering at California State University, Fresno.

=== F-22 Raptor ===
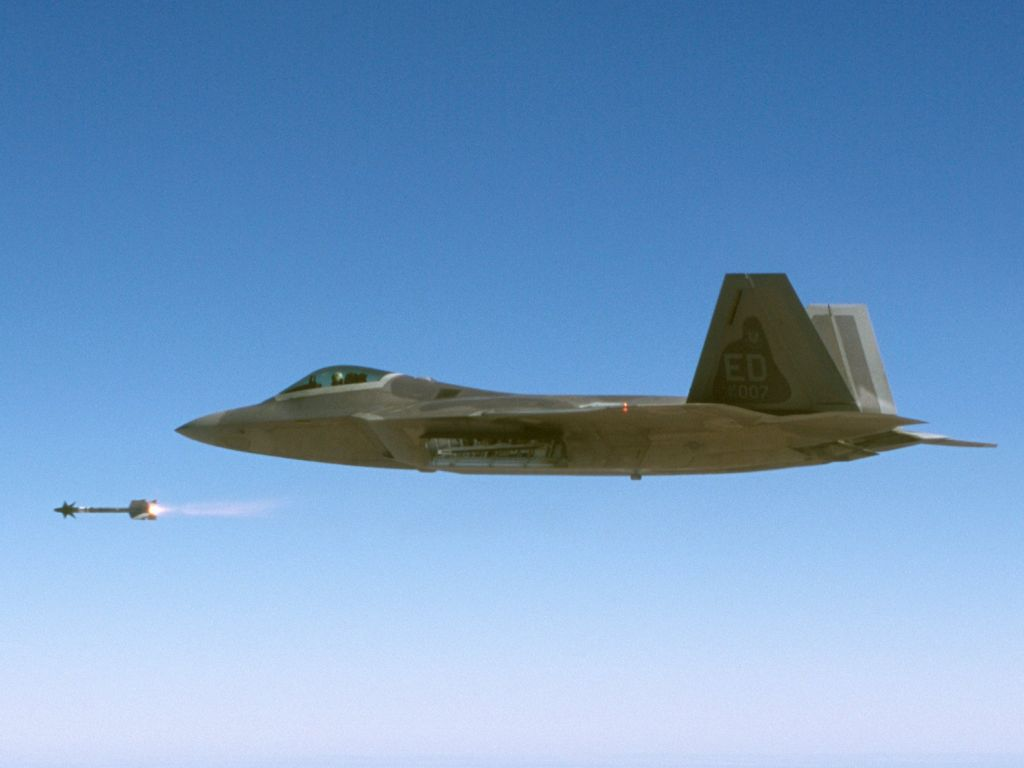
Flying Raptor 4007, JB Brown launches an AIM-9 missile

In 2002, after eight years with F-117 program, Brown transferred to the F-22 Raptor. In this new role, he evaluated updated versions of the avionics software and improved the pilot-vehicle interface. On November 22, 2002, Brown flew the mission that completed all Pentagon-mandated flight test goals needed to start the next phase of the program. On this mission, Brown fired an AIM-9M Sidewinder missile at a supersonic QF-4 unmanned drone flying several miles directly ahead of the F-22. The unarmed missile passed close enough to the target to be assessed a lethal hit, satisfying the criteria needed to start the Dedicated Initial Operational Test & Evaluation (DIOTE) phase the following year.

Brown has successfully dealt with many F-22 emergencies, including a fuel leak at 30,000 feet while traveling at nearly the speed of sound. On another flight, a mechanical problem affected one of the two jet engines shortly after take off. Aware of a similar situation that resulted in the loss of an F-117, Brown idled the ailing engine rather than shut it down. The second engine began losing power during the landing approach. Brown's unconventional technique to handling the initial problem allowed him to narrowly avoid a much more serious situation.

In 2006, Brown was the lead test pilot for the F-22 Raptor program at Edwards Air Force Base. By 2008, Brown had logged over 7,600 flight hours in 124 different types of aircraft. In July 2011, Brown was promoted to Chief Test Pilot of the F-22 Raptor program for Lockheed Martin. In 2012, he became the first test pilot to reach 1,000 flight hours in the F-22. Including his hours in the F-117, Brown had more flight time in stealth jets than any other pilot in the world.

=== Skunk Works and NTPS ===
In 2013, Brown accepted the position of Chief of Flight Operations for the Lockheed Martin Skunk Works providing flight test oversight for evaluations of new technologies. Brown retired from Lockheed in January 2016 and joined the National Test Pilot School (NTPS) as chief operations officer and test pilot instructor. In 2019, he was promoted to NTPS vice president and chief operating officer. In 2022, he was selected as president of the National Test Pilot School (NTPS). At the end of 2024, Brown retired as president of NTPS and moved to North Carolina.

== Leadership in the aviation community ==
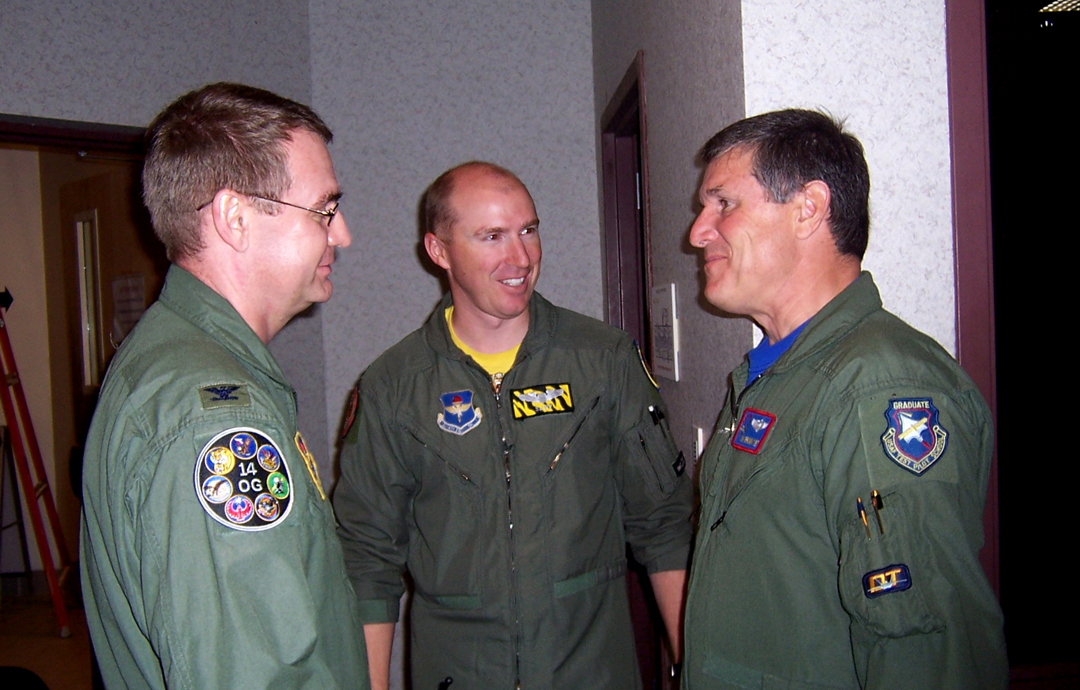
JB Brown (right) receives thanks for his presentation at Columbus AFB

Brown has worked extensively in the aviation community to share his expertise and encourage young aviators and engineers. In 2003, he appeared on the Discovery Channel's television show, Secrets of Future Air Power, and described the stealth, weapons, and thrust vectoring capabilities of the F-22. In 2004, he chaired a panel discussion on the early history of the F-16 Falcon. Convened to celebrate the 30th anniversary of the F-16, the panel consisted of United Airline's captain Joe Sobczak, Lockheed F-22 test pilot, John Fergione, retired USAF Colonel James Rider, and "father of the F‑16", Harry Hillaker.

During 2004–2005, he served as president of the Society of Experimental Test Pilots. At the 2005 Phoenix Leadership Conference, he described aviation's Cockpit Resource Management approach and its relationship to the teamwork effort for businesses. In 2006, he described the unique capabilities of the F-22 to students at Embry–Riddle Aeronautical University. In 2008, Brown presented the status of the F-22 test program to the instructor and student pilots at Columbus Air Force Base in Mississippi. In 2022, he provided insights on flying the F-117 and F-22 at an event hosted by the Western Museum of Flight.

== Honors ==
Brown is a Fellow of both the Society of Experimental Test Pilots and the Royal Aeronautical Society.

In 2003, Brown was elected President on the Society of Experimental Test Pilots. He served as President-Elect in 2003, and President for the one-year term in 2004.
